= Staniszkis =

Staniszkis is a Polish surname, a Polish rendering of the Lithuanian surname Staniškis.

- Jadwiga Staniszkis (1942–2024), Polish sociologist and political scientist
- Maria Staniszkis (1911–2004), Polish lawyer
- Witold Teofil Staniszkis (1880–1941), Polish professor of agriculture, politician and statesman
