= Maciej Wojtkowski =

Polish physicist (born 1975)

- Wojtkowski in 2024
- Born: 9 June 1975 (age 51); Włocławek, Poland
- Citizenship: Poland
- Education: Nicolaus Copernicus University in Toruń (MSc, 1999; PhD, 2003; habilitation, 2010)
- Known for: Co-founding ICTER; Fourier-domain optical coherence tomography; Two-photon vision and retinal imaging
- Awards: Professor Stefan Pieńkowski Award (2004); European Young Investigator Award (2007); Young Scientist Medal, Warsaw University of Technology (2008); Prime Minister's Award (2010); Prize of the Foundation for Polish Science (2012)
- Scientific career
- Fields: Optics; Biomedical imaging; Medical physics
- Workplaces: International Centre for Translational Eye Research (ICTER); Institute of Physical Chemistry of the Polish Academy of Sciences; Nicolaus Copernicus University in Toruń
- Thesis: Spectral Optical Coherence Tomography Using Partially Coherent Light in Medical Applications (2003)
- Website: Institutional profile

Maciej Daniel Wojtkowski (born 1975) is a Polish physicist and professor of physical sciences specialising in optics and biomedical imaging. He received the Prize of the Foundation for Polish Science for developing Fourier-domain optical coherence tomography and introducing it into ophthalmic practice. He is a co-founder of the International Centre for Translational Eye Research (ICTER) at the Institute of Physical Chemistry of the Polish Academy of Sciences and the centre's director.

== Education and career ==
Wojtkowski graduated in physics from Nicolaus Copernicus University in Toruń in 1999. He received his doctorate in 2003 with the dissertation Spectral Optical Coherence Tomography Using Partially Coherent Light in Medical Applications, and his habilitation in 2010 on the basis of Imaging Using Fourier-Domain Optical Coherence Tomography (FD-OCT). Both degrees were awarded at the university's Institute of Physics within the Faculty of Physics, Astronomy and Informatics. He received the Polish academic title of professor of physical sciences in 2014. His appointment document was presented at a ceremony at the Presidential Palace in Warsaw on 28 January 2015.

He began working at Nicolaus Copernicus University in 1999 and led the Optical Biomedical Imaging Group within the Institute of Physics' Department of Biophysics and Medical Physics. Between 1998 and 2001, he conducted research through an exchange programme at the University of Vienna. He worked at the Massachusetts Institute of Technology from 2003 to 2005 and also undertook research visits at the University of Kent in Canterbury and the University of Western Australia in Perth. He is affiliated with the Department of Biophotonics and Optical Engineering at Nicolaus Copernicus University.

In 2016, following an international competition, he was selected to head the Department of Physical Chemistry of Biological Systems at the Institute of Physical Chemistry of the Polish Academy of Sciences. The department was established through the CREATE project ("The CREAtion of the Department of Physical Chemistry of Biological SysTEms"), funded under Horizon 2020.

Together with Krzysztof Palczewski, he founded ICTER within the institute. He has directed the centre since 2019. He also heads its Physical Optics and Biophotonics research group.

Wojtkowski leads the TRIO-VI CoE project, which supports ICTER's development into a centre of excellence for translational research and innovation in ophthalmology. The project began in January 2025 and is scheduled to end in December 2030. It received €15 million in European Union funding through the Teaming for Excellence action under Horizon Europe. The Institute of Physical Chemistry coordinates the project, with University College London and the Institut de la Vision associated with Sorbonne University as strategic partners. Its activities include research collaboration, training and the translation of research findings into ophthalmic practice.

== Research ==
Wojtkowski studies the interaction of light with tissue and develops optical methods for imaging living organisms. His research includes optical coherence tomography, fluorescence imaging of the retina and two-photon vision.

=== Optical coherence tomography ===
In 2002, Wojtkowski and his collaborators published results of in vivo imaging of the human retina using Fourier-domain optical coherence tomography. In 2003, with Tomasz Bajraszewski, Piotr Targowski and Andrzej Kowalczyk, he presented a high-speed spectral optical coherence tomography method that enabled real-time imaging of the eye. The exposure time for an individual axial scan was 64 microseconds.

Between 2003 and 2006, prototypes of his tomograph were tested at ophthalmic clinics in Boston, Pittsburgh and Bydgoszcz. In 2005, he began collaborating with Optopol on industrial production of the device.

=== Two-photon vision and retinal imaging ===
In 2014, Wojtkowski led research into two-photon vision that demonstrated the role of two-photon absorption in the isomerisation of retinal pigments producing visual sensations. In 2021, he and his collaborators presented in vivo images of the human retina obtained using two-photon-excited fluorescence.

His research group at ICTER develops imaging methods that use both the amplitude and phase of light, including techniques based on spatiotemporal optical coherence manipulation (STOC).

=== Research projects ===
He received support through the Foundation for Polish Science's START (2003), POWROTY/HOMING (2006) and TEAM (2011) programmes. In 2007, he received a European Young Investigator Award grant.

From 2017 to 2022, he led the "Two photon vision and two photon eye imaging" project (2x2-PhotonVis), funded through the Foundation for Polish Science's TEAM-TECH programme. It sought to develop methods and instrumentation for functional studies of vision using two-photon processes.

From 2018 to 2021, he led the institute's participation in IMCUSTOMEYE ("IMaging-based CUSTOMised EYE diagnostics"), a Horizon 2020 project concerning the use of photonics and modelling in personalised ophthalmic diagnostics.

From 2019 to 2023, he led the "International Centre for Translational Eye Research" project (MAB/2019/12), funded through the Foundation for Polish Science's International Research Agendas programme, through which ICTER was established.

== Awards and honours ==
- 2001 – scholarship from Polityka through its "Stay with us" programme.
- 2004 – Professor Stefan Pieńkowski Award.
- 2008 – Young Scientist Medal of Warsaw University of Technology.
- 2010 – Prime Minister's Award for his habilitation dissertation.
- 2012 – Prize of the Foundation for Polish Science in mathematical and physical sciences and engineering, for developing Fourier-domain optical coherence tomography and introducing it into ophthalmic practice.

== Memberships ==
Wojtkowski served on the Committee of Biocybernetics and Biomedical Engineering of the Polish Academy of Sciences. He became a Fellow of the Optical Society of America in 2015 and a corresponding member of the Polish Academy of Arts and Sciences in 2016.
