= Andrzej Sobolewski =

Polish physicist

- Born: October 9, 1951 (age 74); Augustów, Polish People's Republic
- Education: University of Warsaw
- Occupation: physicist
- Known for: Sobolewski-Domcke scenario
- Awards: Copernicus Award (2008); Prize of the Foundation for Polish Science (2007)

Andrzej Sobolewski (born 9 October 1951, Augustów) is a Polish physicist and academic working at the Institute of Physics of the Polish Academy of Sciences in Warsaw. He is a fellow of the Alexander von Humboldt Foundation and Foundation for Polish Science as well as a member of the National Science Centre.

== Life and career ==
He was born on 9 October 1951, in Augustów, Polish People's Republic and attended the Grzegorz Piramowicz High School No. 2. In 1977, he graduated in biophysics from the University of Warsaw. Since 1976, he has been working at the Institute of Physics of the Polish Academy of Sciences as an assistant professor and since 1991 as a professor.

At the Faculty of Physics, he received his doctoral degree in 1981 and habilitation in 1989. Between 1985 and 1986, he was on scholarship at LMU Munich. He was also granted an academic scholarship at the University of Arizona in 1994 and Heinrich Heine University Düsseldorf in 1998 and 1999. Since 1990, he has been collaborating with Wolfgang Domcke from LMU Munich. His main area of interest is theoretical physical chemistry. Together with Domcke, he made important contributions to the identification and description of the mechanism responsible for photostability of living matter. This mechanism of radiationless deactivation of electron-excited states of DNA and protein, known as the Sobolewski-Domcke scenario, furthers the understanding of why the fundamental biological structures are relatively resistant to UV radiation. This discovery proved to be of great importance for the research into the beginnings of life on Earth because it explains in what ways the survival and development of living organisms was possible despite strong UV radiation on the Earth at that time.

Sobolewski is also a member of the Warsaw Scientific Society. In 2014, he was appointed member of the council of the National Science Centre (NCN).

== Awards ==
- Carl Friedrich von Siemens Research Award of the Alexander von Humboldt Foundation (2016)
- Officer's Cross of the Order of Polonia Restituta (2013)
- Smoluchowski-Warburg Award (2009)
- Copernicus Award (2008)
- Prize of the Foundation for Polish Science (2007)

== Publications ==
Sobolewski is an author of about 130 original publications in international journals and chapters in three monographs, some of which include:

- Excited-state hydrogen detachment and hydrogen transfer driven by repulsive πσ* states: A new paradigm for nonradiative decay in aromatic biomolecules, Phys. Chem. Chem. Phys. 4 (2002) 1093
- Hydrated hydronium: a cluster model of the solvated electron?, Phys. Chem. Chem. Phys. 4 (2002) 4
- Unraveling the molecular mechanisms of photoacidity, Science 302 (2003) 1693
- Efficient deactivation of a model base pair via excited-state hydrogen transfer, Science 306 (2004) 1765
- Tautomeric selectivity of the excited-state lifetime of guanine/cytosine base pairs: The role of electron-driven proton-transfer processes, Proc. Natl. Acad. Sci. 102 (2005)17903
- Ab initio studies on the radiationless decay mechanisms of the lowest excited singlet states of 9H-adenine, J. Am. Chem. Soc. 127 (2005) 6257
- Photoinduced water splitting with oxotitanium porphyrin: a computational study, Phys. Chem. Chem. Phys. 14 (2012) 12807
- Molecular mechanisms of the photostability of life, Phys. Chem. Chem. Phys. 12 (2010) 4897
- Reversible molecular switch driven by excited-state hydrogen transfer, Phys. Chem. Chem. Phys. 10 (2008) 1243
- Peptide Deactivation: Spectroscopy meets theory, Nature Chemistry 5 (2013) 257

== See also ==
- Prize of the Foundation for Polish Science
- Science in Poland
- List of Poles
