= Maciej Gliwicz =

Polish hydrobiologist (1939–2024)

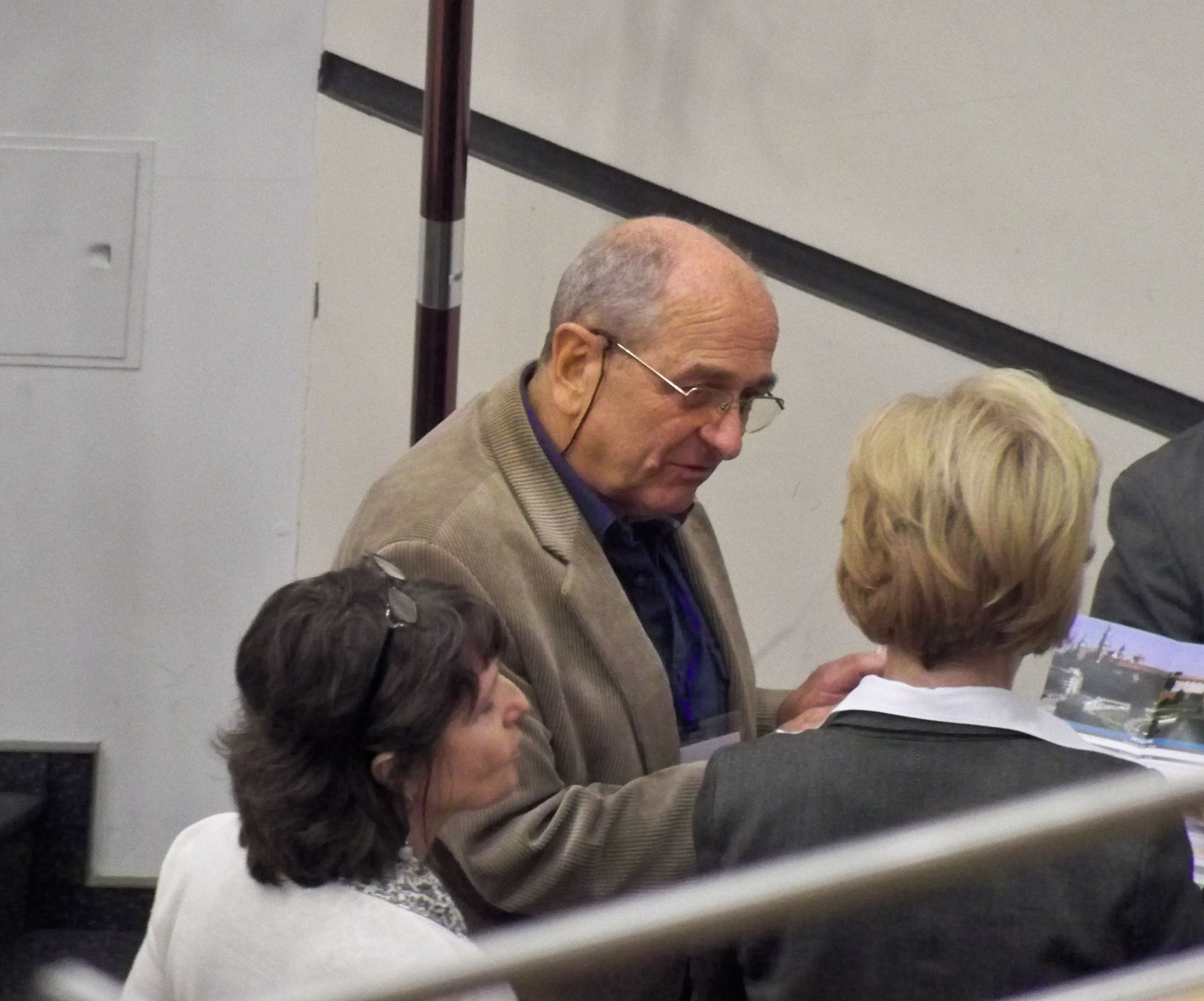
- Gliwicz in 2012
- Born: 21 February 1939; Warsaw, Poland
- Died: 2 June 2024 (aged 85)
- Education: University of Warsaw
- Occupation: Hydrobiologist
- Known for: Research on behavioral ecology
- Spouse: Joanna Gliwicz
- Awards: A.C. Redfield Lifetime Achievement Award (2012); Prize of the Foundation for Polish Science (2001); Naumann-Thienemann Medal (1988)

Maciej Gliwicz (Polish pronunciation: [ma.t͡ɕɛj glivit͡ʂ]; born Zbigniew Maciej Gliwicz; 21 February 1939 – 2 June 2024) was a Polish biologist, evolutionist and professor at the University of Warsaw who specialised in the field of hydrobiology.

== Life and scientific career ==
Gliwicz graduated from the Faculty of Biology and Earth Sciences at the University of Warsaw in 1962. He obtained his doctoral degree in 1969 and became a Professor of Natural Sciences in 1988. Between 1987 and 1990 he worked as Deputy Dean of the Faculty of Biology at the University of Warsaw. Since the mid-1980 until 2009, he also worked as head of the Department of Hydrobiology at his alma mater. He collaborated with a number of international institutions including the Max Planck Institute for Evolutionary Biology in Plön.

Gliwicz was an author and co-author of several hundred scientific papers and publications primarily in the field of hydrobiology with a special focus on behavioral ecology. Some of his interests concern predator-prey relations and trophic cascades among aquatic organisms. He discovered the relationship between the size of filtrator and minimum quantity of threshold food, thus explaining some of the mechanisms of ecological competition and supporting the size-efficiency hypothesis. He also described the phenomenon of the so-called "lunar trap" and explained the convergence of periodic population declines of zooplankton in African water reservoirs along the Zambezi and the lunar cycles.

Gliwicz was one of the members of limnologists who were part of the Plankton Ecology Group, which devised the model of seasonal succession of planktonic events, accepted as the PEG standard model since mid-1980s. He also conducted research into the predation and the evolution of vertical migration in zooplankton.

In 2001, he won Poland's top scientific award, Prize of the Foundation for Polish Science in the category of life sciences, for "revealing the role of predation in shaping animal demography, life histories and behaviour."

In 2012, he became the recipient (together with Winfried Lampert) of the A.C. Redfield Lifetime Achievement Award conferred by the American Society of Limnology and Oceanography "for their outstanding individual and collaborative research, which has laid the foundations for our current understanding of phytoplankton-zooplankton interactions, trophic ecology of zooplankton, and evolutionary relationships in freshwater ecosystems."

As a populariser of Neo-Darwinism, he coorganized evolutionary biology workshops and he was appointed a supervisor of the University of Warsaw's honorary doctorate for American evolutionary geneticist Francisco J. Ayala.

His scientific contributions in hydrobiology have been recognized by scientists who discovered a new genus of diatoms and named it Gliwiczia in his honour.

Gliwicz died on 2 June 2024, at the age of 85.

== Membership ==
- Polish Hydrobiological Society
- Polish Academy of Sciences
- Polish Academy of Learning
- International Society of Limnology
- Fundamental and Applied Limnology
- Journal of Plankton Research
- Aquatic Ecology

== Awards and honours ==
- A.C. Redfield Lifetime Achievement Award – American Society of Limnology and Oceanography (2012)
- Award of the Prime Minister of Poland for outstanding contributions to science (2010)
- Alfred Lityński Medal – Polish Hydrobiological Society (2009)
- Prize of the Foundation for Polish Science (2001)
- Ecology Institute Prize in Limnetic Ecology – International Ecology Institute (ECI) (1997/1998)
- Honorary Member Award, Ecological Society of America (1995)
- Naumann-Thienemann Medal of the International Limnological Society (1988)
- Smithsonian Institution, Award for Academic Achievement (1970)
- University of Warsaw Rector's Award

== See also ==
- Polish Academy of Sciences
- Copernicus Award
