= Maciej Żylicz =

Polish biologist and chemist (born 1953)

- Born: 21 September 1953 (age 73); Gdańsk, Polish People's Republic
- Education: University of Gdańsk
- Occupation: biochemist
- Known for: research on molecular biology
- Awards: Prize of the Foundation for Polish Science (1999); Officer's Cross of the Order of Polonia Restituta (2008); Commander's Cross of the Order of Polonia Restituta (2015)

Maciej Żylicz (Polish pronunciation: [ma.t͡ɕɛj ʐɨlit͡ʂ]; born 21 September 1953) is a Polish biochemist and molecular biologist, professor at the University of Gdańsk, director of the Foundation for Polish Science, member of the Polish Academy of Sciences, State Committee for Scientific Research and a corresponding member of the Polish Academy of Learning.

== Life and career ==
He graduated in experimental physics and biology from the University of Gdańsk. In 1979, he obtained a doctoral degree in natural sciences in the field of biochemistry at the Medical University of Gdańsk. He received a habilitation in molecular biology in 1986 at the University of Gdansk and the title of professor in 1992.

From 1980 until the late 1990s, he worked at the University of Gdańsk. In 1999, he was appointed head of the Faculty of Molecular Biology at the Warsaw-based International Institute of Molecular and Cell Biology (IIMCB). He specializes in the research on heat shock proteins.

In 1999, he won Poland's highest scientific award, Prize of the Foundation for Polish Science for "research on regulatory proteins constituting part of the system protecting cells against undesirable changes in their external environment".

He has published articles in Journal of Biological Chemistry, Journal of Cell Biology as well as European Journal of Biochemistry.

In 2005, he was appointed director of the Foundation for Polish Science. He was head of the Institute of Bioorganic Chemistry at the Polish Academy of Sciences. Between 2010 and 2015, he was an advisor on social policy to President Bronisław Komorowski.

== Awards ==
- Commander's Cross of the Order of Polonia Restituta (2015)
- Honorary doctorate of the Jagiellonian University (2013)
- Honorary doctorate of the University of Gdańsk (2011)
- Officer's Cross of the Order of Polonia Restituta (2008)
- Honorary doctorate of the University of Wrocław (2007)
- Prize of the Foundation for Polish Science (1999)
- Medal of the National Education Commission (1998)
- Johannes Hevelius Prize of the City of Gdańsk (1992)

== See also ==
- List of Poles
- Copernicus Award
