= Bogdan Wojciszke =

- Born: June 11, 1952 (age 74); Gdańsk, Polish People's Republic
- Education: Adam Mickiewicz University, Poznań
- Occupation: psychologist
- Known for: research on personality psychology and social psychology
- Awards: Prize of the Foundation for Polish Science (2016); Order of Polonia Restituta (2011)

Bogdan Wojciszke (born 11 June 1952, Gdańsk) is a Polish psychologist, a humanities professor and an academic teacher.

== Life and career ==
He graduated in psychology from the Adam Mickiewicz University (UAM), Poznań in 1975. In 1978, he received a doctoral degree from the University of Gdańsk and a habilitation from the University of Warsaw in 1986. In 1993, he was granted the title of a professor. He attended science internships at such institutions as University of Aberdeen, Max Planck Institute in Berlin, and the Oxford University (Nuffield College). He was a fellow of Alexander von Humboldt Foundation.

In 1975, he worked at the Adam Mickiewicz University and since 1976 until 2000 he worked at the University of Gdańsk where he was head of the Institute of Psychology. He later worked at the SWPS University of Social Sciences and Humanities where he was appointed head of the institution's branch in Sopot, Pomeranian Voivodeship. He was also director of the Institute of Psychology of the Polish Academy of Sciences (PAN). He became a corresponding member of PAN, a member of the institution's Committee on Psychological Sciences as well as a member of the executive board of the European Association of Experimental Social Psychology (EASP). He was also a member of editorial boards of numerous science journals including Journal of Experimental Social Psychology, European Journal of Social Psychology and Studia Psychologiczne. Between 1995-1999, he worked as an editor-in-chief of Przegląd Psychologiczny. He was chosen a member of the Central Commission for Academic Degrees and Titles (2017-2020).

He specializes in the fields of personality psychology and social psychology. He has conducted research on perceiving and judging people, the dynamics of close intimate relationships, the psychology of power as well as productivity and dignity as ethical values in contemporary Polish society.

In 2011, he was awarded the Commander's Cross of the Order of Polonia Restituta. In 2016, he was the winner of Poland's top science award, Prize of the Foundation for Polish Science in the category of humanities and social sciences for "developing a model of agency and communion as basic dimensions of social cognition".

== Selected publications ==
- Procesy oceniania ludzi, Nakom, Poznań 1991.
- Psychologia miłości: intymność, namiętność, zaangażowanie, Gdańskie Wydawnictwo Psychologiczne, Gdańsk 1994.
- Psychologia rozumienia zjawisk społecznych (co-editor), Wyd. Nauk. PWN, Warsaw 1999.
- Kobieta zmienną jest, Gdańskie Wydawnictwo Psychologiczne, Gdańsk 2009.
- Człowiek wśród ludzi: zarys psychologii społecznej, Scholar, Warsaw 2002.
- Psychologia społeczna, Scholar, Warsaw 2011.

== See also ==
- Copernicus Award
- List of Poles
