= Karol Myśliwiec =

Polish egyptologist (born 1943)

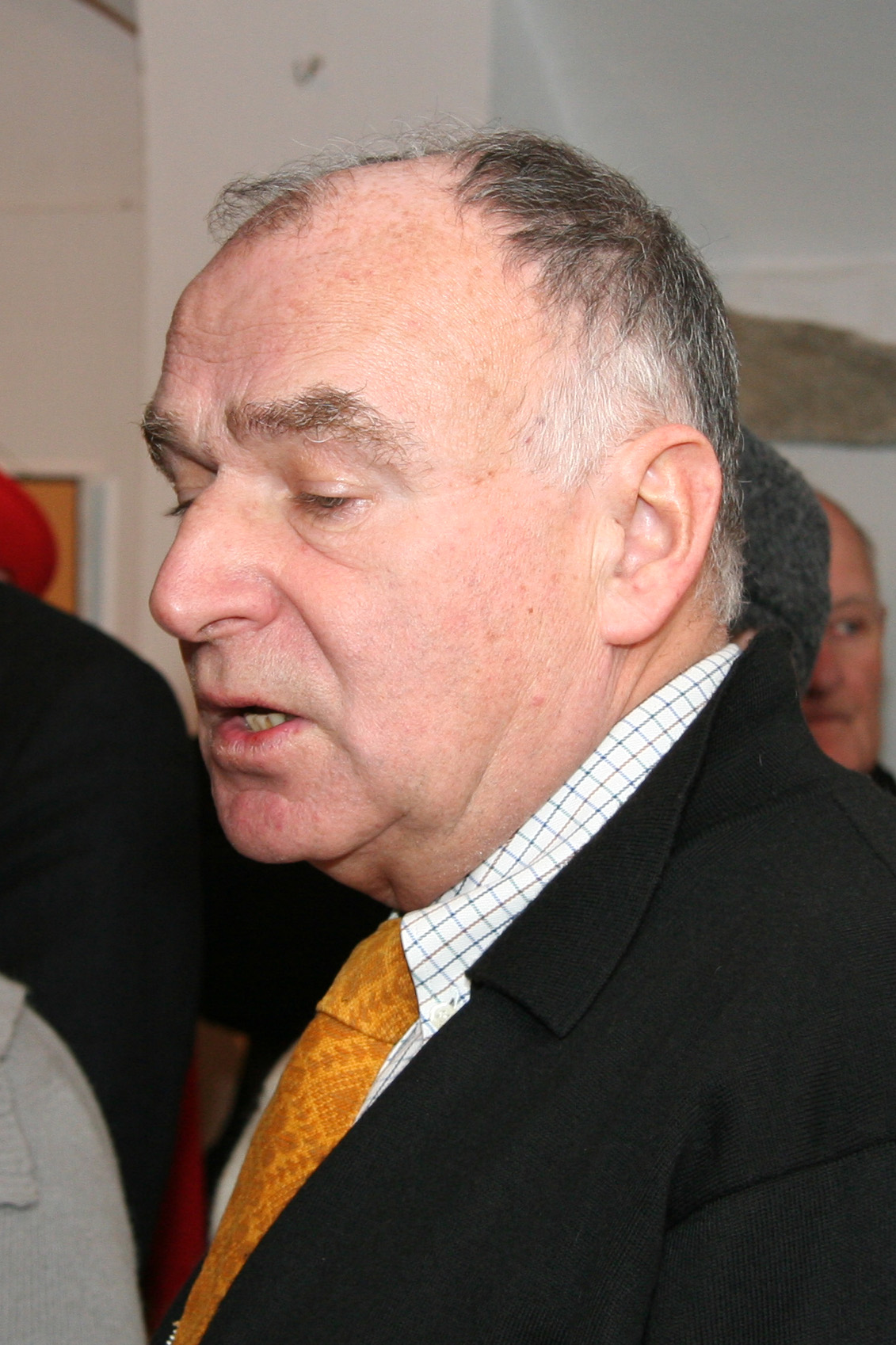
- Karol Myśliwiec in 2009
- Born: 3 November 1943 (age 82); Jasło
- Occupation: Egyptologist

Karol Myśliwiec (born 3 November 1943) is a Polish egyptologist, known for his ongoing efforts at Saqqara to discover the tomb of Imhotep.

== Career ==
Karol Myśliwiec studied Mediterranean archeology at Warsaw University under Kazimierz Michałowski, graduating in 1967. From 1969, under Michałowski's direction, he worked at excavations in Egypt (Alexandria, Deir el-Bahri) and Syria (Palmyra). He also participated in German excavations at the Temple of Pharaoh Seti I (western Thebes) and at Minshat Abu Omar (the Nile Delta).

From 1985 to 1995 Myśliwiec directed Polish-Egyptian excavations at Tell Atrib (the Nile Delta), and since 1987 he has been directing a Polish-Egyptian archeological mission at Saqqara, at the west side of Pharaoh Djoser's Step Pyramid. At Saqqara he has been seeking the tomb of Imhotep, legendary Egyptian physician and architect of the Step Pyramid.

Since 1982 Myśliwiec has been director of the Institute of Mediterranean Archeology at the Polish Academy of Sciences, and since 1992 — director of Warsaw University's Institute of Ancient Egyptian Archeology.

In 2005, he became the recipient of the Prize of the Foundation for Polish Science for the discovery of the tomb of Vizier Merefnebef in the necropolis of Saqqara (Egypt), documented in the monograph The Tomb of Merefnebef. In 2012, he was awarded the Commander's Cross of the Order of Polonia Restituta.

Professor Myśliwiec has published twelve books, including three that have been translated into languages other than Polish, as well as some 300 articles, chiefly on the archeology, history, art and religion of pharaonic Egypt.

He has lectured in several dozen countries, from Japan to Chile, the U.S. and Canada, and is a member of the German Archeological Institute (Berlin), the International Association of Egyptologists, and the Explorers Club (New York City).

== Publications ==
- The Twilight of Ancient Egypt: First Millennium B.C.E., translated by David Lorton, Cornell University Press, 2000.
- Eros on the Nile, translated by Geoffrey L. Packer, Cornell University Press, 2004.

== See also ==
- List of Egyptologists
- List of Poles
