= Andrzej Tarkowski =

Polish embryologist

- Born: Andrzej Krzysztof Tarkowski; 4 May 1933; Warsaw, Poland
- Died: 23 September 2016 (aged 83)
- Education: University of Warsaw
- Known for: Mammalian embryos, Mouse chimeras
- Awards: Albert Brachet Prize (1980); Embryo Transfer Pioneer Award (1991); Japan Prize (2002); Prize of the Foundation for Polish Science (2013)
- Scientific career
- Fields: Embryology, animal genetics

Andrzej Krzysztof Tarkowski (Polish pronunciation: [ˈan.dʐɛj tarkɔfski]; 4 May 1933 – 23 September 2016) was a Polish embryologist and a professor at Warsaw University. He is best known for his pioneering researches on embryos and blastomeres, which have created theoretical and practical basis for achievements of biology and medicine of the twentieth century – in vitro fertilization, cloning and stem cell discovery. In 2002 Tarkowski with Anne McLaren won the Japan Prize for their discoveries concerning the early development of mammalian embryos.

== Career ==
In 1950 Tarkowski was admitted to study at the Faculty of Biology and Earth Sciences (currently the Faculty of Biology) University of Warsaw. He graduated in 1955 with M.Sc. degree. His Ph.D. was received in 1959, and in 1963 he reached a D.Sc. degree at the Faculty of Biology, University of Warsaw. In 1972 he was appointed professor. He eventually received full professorship in 1978. From 1964 until his retirement in 2003 he was the head of the Department of Embryology, and during two periods (1972–1981; 1987–2003) he was the head of the Institute of Zoology in the Faculty of Biology, University of Warsaw.

Tarkowski contributed to international science throughout his professional life. He collaborated with many research centers around the world. He was a Fellow of the Rockefeller Foundation in the Department of Zoology, University College of North Wales (UK), and served as a visiting professor of the Royal Society at the University of Oxford (UK), Rockefeller University of New York (USA), University of Adelaide (Australia) and Institute of Jacques Monod CNRS and Paris University XVII (France). Tarkowski was also a member of the Polish Academy of Sciences, the Polish Academy of Arts and Sciences, the French Academy of Sciences, the American Academy of Sciences, and Academia Europaea. In 1997–2004 he was also a member of the Advisory Board of the Foundation for Polish Science.

In 2003 professor Tarkowski retired.

== Research ==
Pioneering work of Andrzej K. Tarkowski initiated in 1950s formed the basis not only for modern mammalian developmental biology and progress in animal breeding, but also in such techniques as assisted reproduction (in vitro fertilisation) or preimplantational diagnostics. In 1959 Tarkowski showed that a single blastomere isolated from a 2-cell stage mouse embryo is fully able to develop and the result is healthy and fertile mouse (Tarkowski, 1959, Nature). His next achievement was, reported in 1961, birth of first chimaeric mice produced experimentally by injecting blastomeres from one embryo to genetically different embryo (Tarkowski, 1961;Nature). Since then the chimaera has become a useful tool, used in producing genetically modified animals (in this technique genetically engineered stem cells are aggregated with developing embryo. Chimaera obtained this way is phenotypically changed and passes it to the next generation). In 1966 Tarkowski developed a technique which enabled observing chromosome in oocytes, which has been widely used in early studies of embryo (Tarkowski, 1967; Cytogenetics). This publication is often cited, although has been publicised over 50 years ago. In later years professor Tarkowski with his collaborators showed for the first time in history that parthenogenetically activated mouse oocytes are able of developing until mid-gestation (Tarkowski, et al.,1970;Nature). It was a serious argument for the hypothesis of genomic imprinting. Mutually with his Ph.D. student Jacek Kubiak, Tarkowski devised a technique of blastomere electrofusion leading to the generation of tetraploid embryo.

Although Professor Tarkowski retired in 2003, he still continued his researches by undertaking new experiments and inventing new techniques.

== Personal life ==
Professor Tarkowski was passionate about photography. His photographic exhibitions – "Botanical impressions", "Tree and Wood", "The Earth We Walk On" and "On the Border of Nature and Abstraction" – have been appreciated in many Polish cities.

== Honours and awards ==
The achievements of Tarkowski have been honored with prestigious scientific awards such as the Albert Brachet Prize of the Royal Academy of Belgium (1980), Polish National Award (1980), the Alfred Jurzykowski Foundation Award (1984), the Embryo Transfer Pioneer Award, the International Embryo Transfer Society Award (1991), and the Commander's Cross with star of the Order of Polonia Restituta (2012). He was also a laureate of the Foundation for Polish Science Prize (2013) and the Japan Prize (2002).

He also received a Doctor Honoris Causa degree at the Jagiellonian University (2000) and at the Medical University of Łódź (2005). He died on 23 September 2016.

== Most influential publications ==
1. Tarkowski, A.K. (1959) Experiments on the development of isolated blastomeres of mouse eggs. Nature 184, 1286-1287
2. Tarkowski, A.K. (1961) Mouse chimaeras developed from fused eggs. Nature 190, 857-860.
3. Tarkowski, A.K. (1966) An air-drying method for chromosome preparations from mouse eggs. Cytogenetics 5, 394-400.
4. Tarkowski, A.K. and Wroblewska, J. (1967) Development of blastomeres of mouse eggs isolated at the 4- and 8-cell stage. J. Embryol. exp. Morph., 18, 155-180.
5. Tarkowski, A.K., Witkowska, A., and Nowicka, J. (1970) Experimental parthenogenesis in the mouse. Nature 226, 162-165.
6. Tarkowski, A.K. and Rossant, J. (1976) Haploid mouse blastocysts developed from bisected zygotes. Nature 259, 663-665.
7. Tarkowski, A.K., Witkowska, A. and Opas, J. (1977) Development of cytochalasin B-induced tetraploid and diploid/tetraploid mosaic mouse embryos. J. Embryol. exp. Morph. 41, 47-64.
8. Czolowska, R., Modlinski, J.A. and Tarkowski, A.K. (1984) Behaviour of thymocyte nuclei in non-activated and activated mouse oocytes. J. Cell Sci. 69, 19-34.
9. Kubiak and Tarkowski (1985)Electrofusion of mouse blastomeres. Exp. Cell Res. 157, 561-566.
10. Tarkowski et al. (2001) Mouse singletons and twins developed from isolated diploid blastomeres supported with tetraploid blastomeres. Int. J. Dev. Biol. 45, 591-596.
11. Tarkowski et al. (2005) Identical triplets and twins developed from isolated blastomeres of 8- and 16-cell mouse embryos supported with tetraploid blastomeres. Int. J. Dev. Biol. 49, 825-832.
12. Suwińska et al. (2005) Experimentally produced diploid-triploid mouse chimaeras develop up to adulthood. Mol. Rep. Dev. 72, 362-376.
13. Tarkowski et al. (2010) Individual blastomeres of 16- and 32- cell mouse embryos are able to develop into foetuses and mice. Dev. Biol. 348, 190-198.
