= Prize of the Foundation for Polish Science =

Scientific award in Poland

- Awarded for: significant advancements and scientific discoveries which shift cognitive boundaries and open new perspectives for research
- Country: Poland
- Presented by: Foundation for Polish Science
- Reward: PLN 200,000 (ca.$60,000)
- First award: 1992
- Website: www.fnp.org.pl/en/oferta/the-fnp-prize/

The Prize of the Foundation for Polish Science (Polish: Nagroda Fundacji na rzecz Nauki Polskiej) is the most prestigious scientific award in Poland given every year from 1992 by a non-governmental non-profit Polish organization, Foundation for Polish Science (Polish: Fundacja na rzecz Nauki Polskiej). The prize is widely regarded as the top scientific award in Poland. The Prizes awarded in 2013 equal PLN 200,000 (approximately $60,000).

Since 2011, the Prize is awarded in four categories: Life Sciences; Chemical and Material Sciences; Mathematics, Physics and Engineering Sciences; as well as Humanities and Social Sciences. Candidates can be either Polish scientists working in Poland or abroad, foreign ones working there, provided that their achievement has been realized within the territory of the Republic of Poland, as well as foreigners dealing with matters pertaining to Poland.

As of 2025, 125 individuals have been awarded the prize including 13 women. Among the notable winners are: Krzysztof Matyjaszewski, Andrzej Tarkowski, Bohdan Paczyński, Timothy D. Snyder, Anna Wierzbicka, Maciej Gliwicz, Ryszard Gryglewski, Zofia Kielan-Jaworowska, Aleksander Wolszczan, Andrzej Udalski, Tomasz Dietl, Andrzej Sobolewski, and Karol Modzelewski.

== Criteria ==
The prize honours renowned scientists for significant advancements and scientific discoveries which shift cognitive boundaries and open new perspectives for research, provide an exceptional contribution towards the advancement of our nation's progress and culture as well as assure Poland a significant position for undertaking the most ambitious challenges of the modern world. Subject of the Prize may include clearly defined and confirmed scientific achievements which have in the recent period opened new perspectives for further research.

== Recipients ==
Source: Foundation for Polish Science

=== Life Sciences ===
Year	Recipient	Institution	Justification
1992	Ewa Kamler	Institute of Ecology, Polish Academy of Sciences	for her Early Life History of Fish: An Energetics Approach published in London by Chapman and Hall
1993	Wiesław Wiktor Jędrzejczak	Medical University of Warsaw	for his series of studies on the molecular and cellular mechanisms involved in blood-cell generation
1994	Krzysztof Selmaj	Medical Academy of Łódź	for his studies into new immunological mechanisms in autoimmune diseases of the nervous system, Multiple Sclerosis in particular
1995	Stanisław Konturek	Jagiellonian University	for his studies on the importance of local blood circulation in the mucous membrane of the stomach and the duodenum in the cyto-protective function of the mucous
1996	Aleksander Koj	Jagiellonian University	for a series of papers concerning the regulation of the acute phase protein synthesis
1997	Ryszard Gryglewski	Jagiellonian University	for a series of studies on the regulation of thromboresistance
1998	Andrzej Szczeklik	Jagiellonian University	for discovering the anti-thrombotic properties of aspirin, and studies on the pathogenesis and treatment of aspirin-induced bronchial asthma
1999	Maciej Żylicz	University of Gdańsk, Medical University of Gdańsk	for research on regulatory proteins constituting part of the system protecting cells against undesirable changes in their external environment
2000	Leszek Kaczmarek	Polish Academy of Sciences	for his work on the impact of stimuli on gene expression in selected brain structures of mammals
2001	Maciej Gliwicz	University of Warsaw	for revealing the role of predation in shaping animal demography, life histories and behaviour
2002	Mariusz Jaskólski	Adam Mickiewicz University	for explaining the mechanisms leading to the formation of amyloidal aggregates of human protein (cystatin C): an important factor in various brain disorders and diseases in humans
2003	Roman Kaliszan	Gdańsk Medical Academy	or applications of mathematical modelling and chromatography in defining the correlation between the chemical structure of drugs and their pharmacological properties
2004	Janusz Limon	Department of Biology and Genetics, Gdańsk Medical Academy	or his outstanding contribution to the development of cytogenetic methods used in the diagnosis of malignant tumours
2005	Zofia Kielan-Jaworowska	Institute of Paleobiology, Polish Academy of Sciences	for a creative synthesis of research on the Mesozoic evolution of mammals presented in the fundamental work Mammals from the Age of Dinasours (2004)
2006	Mariusz Ratajczak	Pomeranian Medical University; University of Louisville	for discovering cells functionally resembling embryonic stem cells in bone marrow and umbilical blood
2007	Włodzimierz Krzyżosiak	Institute of Bioorganic Chemistry, Polish Academy of Sciences	for discovering the mechanism of selective silencing of genetic information that can lead to neurodegenerative diseases
2008	Jacek Oleksyn	Institute of Dendrology, Polish Academy of Sciences	for his contribution to the discovery of the universal, bio-geographic correlations between plant characteristics, that are fundamental for understanding ecological processes on a global scale
2009	Andrzej Koliński	University of Warsaw	for development and practical application of unique methods for protein structure prediction
2010	Tomasz Guzik	Jagiellonian University	for demonstrating the importance of the immune system in the pathogenesis of hypertension
2011	Jan Potempa	Jagiellonian University; University of Louisville	for the characterization of a new family of bacterial proteases and for demonstration of their role in the development of periodontal disease
2012	Krzysztof Palczewski	Case Western Reserve University	for characterizing crystal structures of native and activated G protein-coupled receptor, rhodopsin, involved in eyesight
2013	Andrzej Tarkowski	University of Warsaw	for discoveries explaining the fundamental mechanisms responsible for the early development of mammalian embryos
2014	Tomasz Goslar	Adam Mickiewicz University in Poznań	for his contribution to determining the chronology of changes in C14 carbon isotope concentration in the atmosphere during the last ice age, which is of key importance for contemporary climate research
2015	Prize not awarded		
2016	Jan Kozłowski	Institute of Environmental Sciences at Jagiellonian University	for formulation and experimental verification of a theory explaining the diversity of life strategies of organisms resulting from optimal allocation of resources
2017	Piotr Trzonkowski	Gdańsk Medical University	for studies on regulatory T cells and their pioneering use in cell therapy of human diseases
2018	Andrzej Dziembowski	Institute of Biochemistry and Biophysics of the Polish Academy of Sciences	for explaining the function of key enzymes involved in RNA degradation, the dysfunction of which leads to pathological states
2019	Prize not awarded		
2020	Jacek Radwan	Adam Mickiewicz University	for demonstrating the role of evolutionary mechanism for optimizing genetic variability in shaping resistance to pathogens and tolerating own antigens
2021	Bożena Kamińska-Kaczmarek	Marceli Nencki Institute of Experimental Biology, Polish Academy of Sciences	for the discovery of mechanisms that cause malignant gliomas to reprogram immune cells in such a way that they support the development of these brain tumors
2022	Marcin Nowotny	Medical University of Warsaw	for the explanation of the molecular mechanisms of DNA damage recognition and its repair
2023	Krzysztof Liberek	University of Gdańsk, Medical University of Gdańsk	for demonstrating the role of chaperone proteins in recovering proteins from aggregates and folding them into the active form
2024	Sebastian Glatt	Jagiellonian University	for the determination of the structure and function of the Elongator complex, which affects the accuracy of protein biosynthesis
2025	Ewelina Knapska	Polish Academy of Sciences	for discovering the neuronal mechanisms underlying intra- and interspecies transmission of emotions.

=== Chemical and Materials Sciences ===
Year	Recipient	Institution	Justification
1993	Kazimierz Sobczyk	Polish Academy of Sciences	for his studies on the stochastic dynamics of systems and construction materials
1995	Maksymilian Pluta	Institute of Applied Optics in Warsaw	presenting pioneering ideas related to phase-contrast microscopy and interference polarisational microinterferometry as applied in the construction of optical tools
1997	Antoni Rogalski	Military University of Technology in Warsaw	or his studies on infrared radiation detectors using triple semiconductive compounds
1998	Leszek Stoch	AGH University of Science and Technology	for explaining the phenomenon of multi-stage crystallisation of vitreous materials and developing a method for the production of new forms of glass for pro-environmental applications
1999	Zdzisław Kowalczuk	Gdańsk University of Technology	for research in the field of automation concerning the design of continuous time control systems
2000	Jan Węglarz	Poznań University of Technology	for developing a variety of methods for designing IT systems for production management and control, using discrete-continuous scheduling
2001	Michał Kleiber	Polish Academy of Sciences	for describing new computational methods of analysis and optimisation in non-linear thermomechanics of deformed bodies
2002	Adam Proń	Warsaw University of Technology	for his contribution to research on electroactive polymers and the development of processible conducting polymers
2004	Krzysztof Matyjaszewski	Carnegie Mellon University	for developing new methods for controlled radical polimerisation and their application in industry
2005	Roman Słowiński	Poznań University of Technology	for developing a methodology for computer-aided decision-making based on incomplete data
2006	Leon Gradoń	Warsaw University of Technology	for developing the theory of aerosol and microparticle transport processes in gases and liquids and its application in technical and medical equipment
2007	Andrzej Nowicki	Polish Academy of Sciences	for developing the theoretical foundation and production implementation of ultrasound scanners with colour imaging of blood flow
2008	Andrzej Jajszczyk	AGH University of Science and Technology	for his research in the theory of high-speed telecommunication network nodes as the basis for building the next generation Internet
2009	Bogdan Marciniec	Adam Mickiewicz University	for discovery of new reactions and new catalysts for processes leading to synthesis of organosilicon materials for industrial applications
2011	Elżbieta Frąckowiak	Poznań University of Technology	for research on new materials, carbon composites and their use for electrochemical energy storage and conversion
2012	Mieczysław Mąkosza	Polish Academy of Sciences	for discovery and introduction of vicarious nucleophilic substitution into the canon of organic chemistry
2013	Sylwester Porowski	Institute of High Pressure Physics, Polish Academy of Sciences	for developing a high-pressure method for producing gallium nitride monocrystals
2014	Karol Grela	Institute of Organic Chemistry, Polish Academy of Sciences; University of Warsaw	for developing new catalysts for olefin metathesis reactions and applying them in industrial practice
2015	Stanisław Penczek	Centre for Molecular and Macromolecular Studies, Polish Academy of Sciences	for elaboration of the theory of ring-opening polymerization and its use for synthesis of biodegradable polymers
2016	Marek Samoć	Faculty of Chemistry, Wrocław University of Science and Technology	for research on nanostructural materials for nonlinear optics
2017	Daniel Gryko	Institute of Organic Chemistry, Polish Academy of Sciences	for the development of an original method for synthesis and characterization of porphyrinoids
2018	Andrzej Gałęski	Centre of Molecular and Macromolecular Studies of the Polish Academy of Sciences in Łódź	for developing a new mechanism for plastic deformation of polymers
2019	Marcin Drąg	Faculty of Chemistry, Wrocław University of Science and Technology	for developing a new technological platform for obtaining biologically active compounds, in particular proteolytic enzymes inhibitors
2020	Ewa Górecka	University of Warsaw	for obtaining liquid crystal materials with a chiral structure made of non-chiral molecules
2021	Jacek Jemielity	University of Warsaw	for developing chemical modifications of mRNA as tools for therapeutic applications and studies on cellular processes
2022	Bartosz Grzybowski	Polish Academy of Sciences, Ulsan National Institute of Science and Technology	for the development and empirical verification of an algorithmic methodology for planning chemical synthesis
2023	Marcin Stępień	University of Wrocław	for designing and obtaining new aromatic compounds with unique structures and properties
2024	Janusz Lewiński	Warsaw University of Technology, Polish Academy of Sciences	for the development of mechanochemical methods for the synthesis of perovskites, improving their photovoltaic properties
2025	Dorota Gryko	Polish Academy of Sciences	for the development of innovative photocatalytic methods for the greener synthesis of organic compounds, representing an important contribution to the field of organic chemistry

=== Mathematical, Physical and Engineering Sciences ===
Year	Recipient	Institution	Justification
1992	Aleksander Wolszczan	Pennsylvania State University	for discovering the first extrasolar planet system
1993	S. L. Woronowicz	University of Warsaw	for his studies on quantum groups and their relations with C*-algebra
1994	Zbigniew Ryszard Grabowski	Polish Academy of Sciences	for developing new methods for molecule generation in states with significant electron charge dislocation
1995	Adam Sobiczewski	Andrzej Sołtan Institute of Nuclear Studies	for his studies predicting the existence of unexpectedly stable nuclei of the heaviest elements, later confirmed in laboratory tests conducted in 1993
1996	Bohdan Paczyński	Princeton University	for the development of a new method of detecting space objects and establishing their mass using the gravitational lenses effect
1997	Tomasz Łuczak	Adam Mickiewicz University	for his work on the theory of random discrete structures
1998	Lechosław Latos-Grażynski	University of Warsaw	for his studies on porphyrines and metalporphyrines with specific molecular and electronic structures
2000	Bogumił Jeziorski	University of Warsaw	for developing a new formulae of exact quantum calculations of interatomic and intermolecular interactions
2001	Ludomir Newelski	University of Wrocław	for his work in the field of mathematical logic, being a breakthrough in model theory and algebra
2002	Andrzej Udalski	University of Warsaw	for his work concerning the revision of the distance scale of the Universe and discovering many planetary low-luminosity companions to solar-type stars
2003	Marek Pfützner	University of Warsaw	for experimental confirmation of a new type of radioactivity – the two-proton decay
2004	Wojciech Stec	Polish Academy of Sciences	for obtaining new biologically active compounds with a high treatment potential, using his own innovative method for the synthesis of thiophosphate DNA analogues
2006	Tomasz Dietl	Institute of Physics, Polish Academy of Sciences	for developing the theory, confirmed in recent years, of diluted ferromagnetic semiconductors, and for demonstrating new methods in controlling magnetization
2007	Andrzej Sobolewski	Polish Academy of Sciences	for explaining the photostability of biological matter by discovering a new mechanism of radiationless deactivation of electron-excited states of DNA and proteine
2008	Ryszard Horodecki	University of Gdańsk	for his contribution to creating the foundations of quantum information technology and the development of the basics of quantum physics
2009	Józef Barnaś	Adam Mickiewicz University, Polish Academy of Sciences	for development of the theoretical foundations of spintronics, particularly explanation of the phenomenon of giant magnetoresistance
2010	Tadeusz Marek Krygowski	University of Warsaw	for creating a method for quantifying the aromaticity of organic compounds
2011	Maciej Lewenstein	ICFO	for achievements in the area of quantum optics and the physics of ultra-cold gases
2012	Maciej Wojtkowski	Nicolaus Copernicus University	for developing and introducing Fourier domain optical coherence tomography into clinical ophthalmology
2013	Marek Żukowski	University of Gdańsk	for research on multi-photon entangled states, which led to formulation of information causality as a principle of physics
2014	Iwo Białynicki-Birula	Polish Academy of Sciences	for fundamental electromagnetic field research that has led to the development of the Uncertainty principle for photons
2015	Kazimierz Rzążewski	Centre for Theoretical Physics, Polish Academy of Sciences	for discovery of the phenomenon of magnetostriction in ultra-cold gases with dipole forces
2016	Józef Spałek	Institute of Physics, Jagiellonian University	for research on strongly correlated electron systems, in particular derivation of the T-J model
2017	Andrzej Trautman	University of Warsaw	for the theoretical demonstration of the reality of gravitational waves
2018	Krzysztof Pachucki	University of Warsaw	for precise quantum electrodynamic calculation of spectroscopic parameters of lightweight atoms and molecules
2019	Andrzej Kossakowski	Institute of Physics at Nicolaus Copernicus University	for developing of the theory of open quantum systems
2020	Krzysztof M. Górski	University of Warsaw and NASA Jet Propulsion Laboratory, California Institute of Technology (Caltech)	for the development and implementation of the methodology of analysis of the relic radiation maps, crucial for understanding the early stages of evolution of the universe
2021	Grzegorz Pietrzyński	Nicolaus Copernicus Astronomical Centre, Polish Academy of Sciences	for the precise distance determination to the Large Magellanic Cloud
2022	Prize not awarded		
2023	Rafał Latała	University of Warsaw	for developing mathematical tools which led to the proof of Talagrand's Bernoulli Conjecture
2024	Krzysztof Sacha	Jagiellonian University	for the formulation of the theory of time crystals
2025	Wojciech Knap	Polish Academy of Sciences, Warsaw University of Technology	for developing new methods of detecting, amplifying, and generating terahertz waves for ultra-fast wireless communication

=== Humanities and Social Sciences ===
Year	Recipient	Institution	Justification
1992	Marian Biskup	Polish Academy of Sciences	for his study The Prussian War, or Poland's Fight with the Teutonic Order 1519–1521
1994	Roman Aftanazy	The Ossolinski's National Institute	for his eleven-volume work under the collective title Materiały do dziejów rezydencji (Materials for the History of Residences)
1995	Teresa Michałowska	Polish Academy of Sciences	for her fundamental work Średniowiecze ("The Middle Ages", 1995), presenting Polish and Latin writings of the first half of the Second Millennium and their role in Polish culture in a new perspective
1996	Jerzy Gadomski	Jagiellonian University	for his three-volume work, Gothic Tabular Paintings of the Little Poland Region"
1997	Andrzej Paczkowski	Polish Academy of Sciences	for his work Pół wieku dziejów Polski 1939–1989 ("Half a Century of Polish History 1939–1989")
1998	Janusz Sondel	Jagiellonian University	for his Latin-Polish Dictionary for Lawyers and Historians, constituting a significant contribution to the knowledge about Latin sources of Polish culture
1999	Mieczysław Tomaszewski	Academy of Music in Kraków	for his publication Chopin: The Man, the Work, the Resonance, an innovative synthesis of knowledge about the great composer
2000	Jan Strelau	University of Warsaw	for his innovative regulative theory of temperament, and in particular for his work Temperament: A Psychological Perspective (1998)
2001	Stefan Swieżawski	John Paul II Catholic University of Lublin	for his work A History of European Classical Philosophy, being decisive in the research upon the changes in European philosophical thought in antiquity and the Middle Ages
2002	Lech Leciejewicz	University of Wrocław, Polish Academy of Sciences	for his work The New Shape of the World: The Birth of Medieval European Civilisation
2003	Jerzy Szacki	University of Warsaw	for his fundamental work Historia myśli socjologicznej ("A History of Sociological Thought") (2002), a comprehensive and innovative diachronic presentation of the various perspectives and perceptions of social phenomena
2004	Jadwiga Staniszkis	University of Warsaw	for her studies aimed at developing a theoretical framework for, and interpreting the current transformation process in Poland and elsewhere in the world, presented in her books Postkomunizm ("Post-Communism", 2001) and Władza globalizacji ("The Power of Globalisation", 2003)
2005	Karol Myśliwiec	Polish Academy of Sciences	for the discovery of the tomb of Vizier Merefnebef in the necropolis of Saqqara (Egypt), documented in the monograph The Tomb of Merefnebef (2004)
2006	Piotr Sztompka	Jagiellonian University	for an original overview of the ideas of contemporary sociology, allowing for a better understanding of the determinants and dynamics of complex changes in modern societies documented in such books as: Socjologia. Analiza społeczeństwa ("Sociology. An Analysis of Society") and Socjologia zmian społecznych ("Sociology of Social Change")
2007	Karol Modzelewski	University of Warsaw	for his research on the emergence of the European identity revealing the importance of pre-Christian and multicultural tradition for the contemporary concept of Europe, presented in his work Barbarzyńska Europa ("Barbarian Europe")
2008	Stanisław Mossakowski	Polish Academy of Sciences	for his comprehensive, interdisciplinary monograph on the Sigismund Chapel of the Wawel Cathedral – a leading historic building of Polish and Italian Renaissance art
2009	Jerzy Strzelczyk	Adam Mickiewicz University	for the dissertation A Pen in Slender Hands, which takes a fresh look at the contributions made by creative works by women to the development of European civilisation from antiquity through the first millennium AD
2010	Anna Wierzbicka	Australian National University	for developing the theory of the natural semantic metalanguage and discovering a set of elementary meanings common to all languages
2011	Tomasz Giaro	University of Warsaw	for an interdisciplinary analysis of the category of truth in the doctrines of law from antiquity to the present – opening new prospects for understanding of the law as one of the foundations of European civilization
2012	Ewa Wipszycka	University of Warsaw	for her wide-reaching reconstruction of the functioning of monastic communities in Egypt during the late antiquity
2013	Jan Woleński	Jagiellonian University	for a comprehensive analysis of the work of the Lwów–Warsaw school and for placing its achievements within the international discourse of contemporary philosophy
2014	Lech Szczucki	Polish Academy of Sciences	for explaining the cultural ties between Central and Western Europe in a monumental edition of the correspondence of Andrzej Dudycz, the 16th-century thinker, religious reformer and diplomat
2015	Jerzy Jedlicki	Tadeusz Manteuffel Institute of History, Polish Academy of Sciences	for fundamental studies on the phenomenon of the intelligentsia as a social stratum and its role in modernization processes in Central & Eastern Europe
2016	Bogdan Wojciszke	SWPS University	for developing a model of agency and communion as basic dimensions of social cognition
2017	Krzysztof Pomian	CNRS; Nicolaus Copernicus University in Toruń	for pioneering research on the history of collecting and the influence of science and art on the development of European culture
2018	Timothy Snyder	Yale University	for analysis of the political and social mechanisms that led to national conflicts and genocide in Central Europe in the 20th century
2019	Andrzej Wiśniewski	Faculty of Psychology and Cognitive Science at Adam Mickiewicz University	for developing the concept of inferential erotetic logic
2020	Romuald Schild	Institute of Archeology and Ethnology, Polish Academy of Sciences	for explaining the climatic and environmental determinants of sociocultural processes during the Stone Age in North Africa and the Great European Plain
2021	Cezary Cieśliński	Faculty of Philosophy, University of Warsaw	for solving the key problems of the deflationary theory of truth
2022	Adam Lajtar	University of Warsaw	for the interpretation of epigraphic sources explaining the religious-cultural functioning of medieval communities living in the Nile Valley
2023	Maria Lewicka	Nicolaus Copernicus University	for formulating and verifying a psychological model of place attachment and place memory
2024	Marcin Wodziński	University of Wrocław	for an innovative study of Hasidism that explains the role of culture, politics, and geography in shaping religious identities and interethnic relations
2025	Anna Matysiak	University of Warsaw	for identifying key labour market characteristics and working conditions that influence fertility

== Laureates by institution ==
Institution	Number
Polish Academy of Sciences	33
University of Warsaw	23
Jagiellonian University	14
Adam Mickiewicz University	8
Medical University of Gdańsk	3
Nicolaus Copernicus University in Toruń	3
Poznań University of Technology	3
University of Gdańsk	3
Warsaw University of Technology	3
AGH University of Science and Technology	2
University of Louisville	2
University of Wrocław	2
Wrocław University of Science and Technology	2
Academy of Music in Kraków	1
Andrzej Sołtan Institute of Nuclear Studies	1
Australian National University	1
California Institute of Technology	1
Carnegie Mellon University	1
Case Western Reserve University	1
CRNS	1
Gdańsk University of Technology	1
ICFO	1
John Paul II Catholic University of Lublin	1
Medical Academy of Łódź	1
Medical University of Warsaw	1
Military University of Technology in Warsaw	1
The Ossoliński's National Institute	1
Pennsylvania State University	1
Pomeranian Medical University	1
Princeton University	1
SWPS University	1
Yale University	1

== See also ==
- List of general science and technology awards
