= List of general science and technology awards =

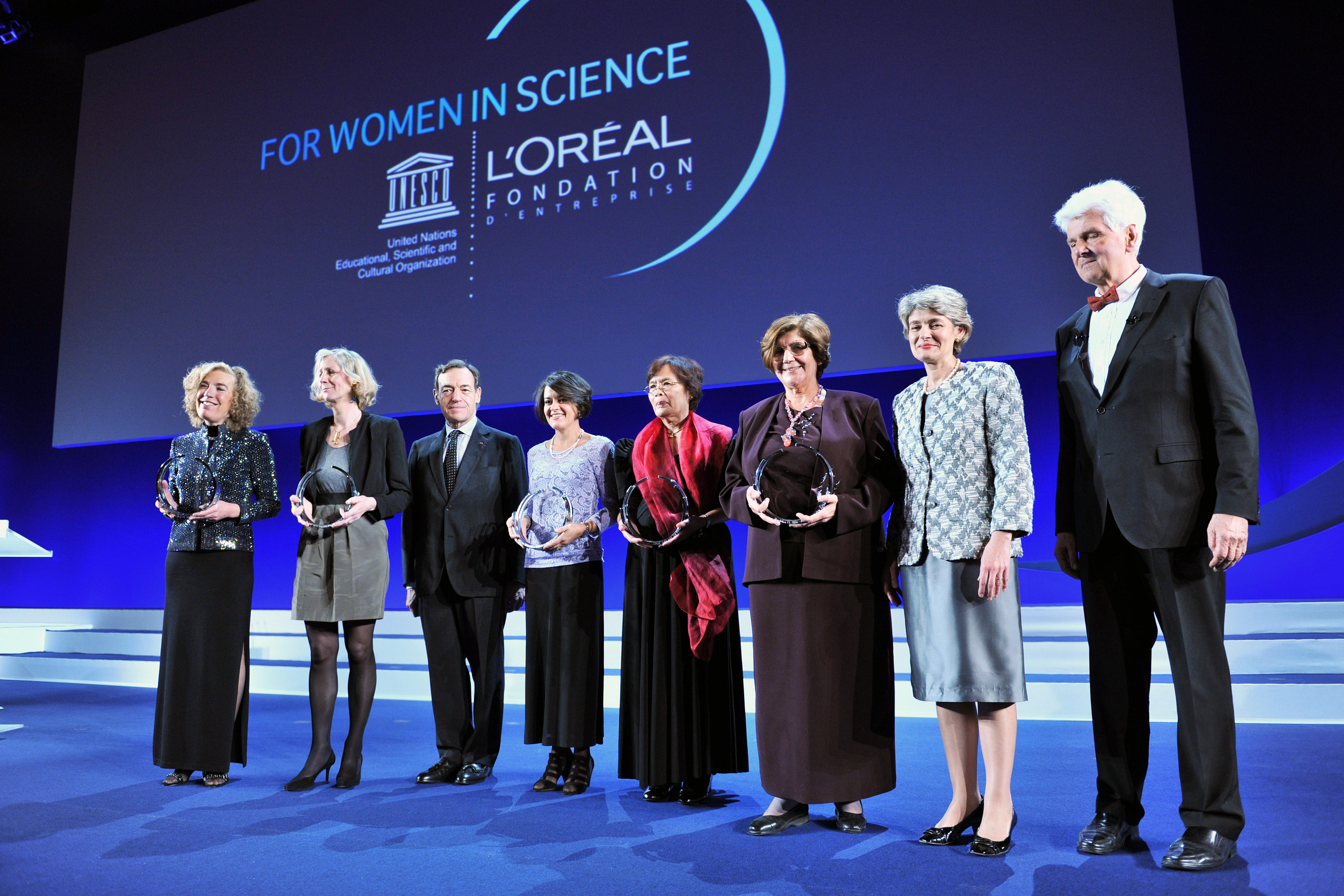
Winners of the 2010 L'Oréal-UNESCO For Women in Science Awards at UNESCO Headquarters, Paris

This list of general science and technology awards is an index to articles about notable awards for general contributions to science and technology. These awards typically have broad scope, and may apply to many or all areas of science and/or technology. The list is organized by region and country of the sponsoring organization, but awards are not necessarily limited to people from that country.

== International ==
Country	Award	Sponsor	Notes
International	Albert Einstein World Award of Science	World Cultural Council	Recognition and encouragement for scientific and technological research and development
International	Kalinga Prize	UNESCO	Exceptional skill in presenting scientific ideas to lay people
International	L'Oréal-UNESCO For Women in Science Awards	L'Oréal and UNESCO	Outstanding women researchers who have contributed to scientific progress

== Africa ==
Country	Award	Sponsor	Notes
African Union	African Union Kwame Nkrumah Award for Scientific Excellence	African Union	To recognize and honor outstanding scientific achievements in Africa
Nigeria	Nigeria Prize for Science	Nigeria LNG, Nigerian Academy of Science and the Nigerian Academy of Letters	Excellence in science breakthroughs
South Africa	Harry Oppenheimer Fellowship Award	Oppenheimer Memorial Trust	Leading scholars who have a sustained record of outstanding research and intellectual achievement at the highest level

== Americas ==
Country	Award	Sponsor	Notes
Canada	Henry Marshall Tory Medal	Royal Society of Canada	Outstanding research in a branch of astronomy, chemistry, mathematics, physics, or an allied science
Canada	Prix Lionel-Boulet	Government of Quebec	Researchers who have distinguished themselves through their inventions, their scientific and technological innovations, their leadership in scientific development, and their contribution to Québec's economic growth
Canada	Prix Marie-Victorin	Government of Quebec	Researchers in the pure and applied sciences whose work lies in fields outside biomedicine, including natural and physical sciences, engineering, technology, and agricultural sciences
Canada	Sandford Fleming Award	Royal Canadian Institute	Outstanding contributions to the public understanding of science
Canada	Sir John William Dawson Medal	Royal Society of Canada	Important and sustained contributions by one individual in at least two different domains
United States	Arthur B. Guise Medal	Society of Fire Protection Engineers	Eminent achievement in the advancement of the science and technology of fire protection engineering
United States	Barnard Medal for Meritorious Service to Science	Columbia University and National Academy of Sciences	Meritorious service to science
United States	Benjamin Franklin Medals	Franklin Institute	Medals for Chemistry, Computer and Cognitive Science, Earth and Environmental Science, Electrical Engineering, Life Science, Mechanical Engineering, and Physics
United States	Blavatnik Awards for Young Scientists	Blavatnik Family Foundation and New York Academy of Sciences	Faculty researchers age 42 years and younger who work in the life sciences, chemical sciences, and physical sciences and engineering at institutions across the United States and postdoctoral researchers in the New York tri-state area
United States	Common Wealth Award of Distinguished Service	PNC Financial Services	Outstanding achievement in dramatic arts, literature, science, invention, mass communications, public service, government and sociology
United States	George Sarton Medal	History of Science Society	Historian of science from the international community
United States	Global Security Challenge	London Business School, InnoCentive	Competition to find and select the most promising security technology startups in the world
United States	Harold Brown Award	United States Air Force	Scientist or engineer who applies scientific research to solve a problem critical to the needs of the Air Force
United States	Howard N. Potts Medal	Franklin Institute	Science and engineering award (no longer awarded)
United States	John J. Carty Award for the Advancement of Science	National Academy of Sciences	Noteworthy and distinguished accomplishments in any field of science within the charter of the academy
United States	Leidy Award	Academy of Natural Sciences of Drexel University	Excellence in publications, explorations, discoveries or research in the natural sciences
United States	Magellanic Premium	American Philosophical Society	Major contributions in the field of navigation (whether by sea, air, or in space), astronomy, or natural philosophy
United States	Margaret W. Rossiter History of Women in Science Prize	History of Science Society	Outstanding book or article on the history of women in science
United States	NAS Award for Scientific Reviewing	National Academy of Sciences	Authors whose reviews have synthesized extensive and difficult material, rendering a significant service to science and influencing the course of scientific thought
United States	NAS Award for the Industrial Application of Science	National Academy of Sciences	Original scientific work of intrinsic scientific importance and with significant, beneficial applications in industry
United States	National Medal of Science	President of the United States on recommendation of the National Science Foundation	Individuals in science and engineering who have made important contributions to the advancement of knowledge in the fields of behavioral and social sciences, biology, chemistry, engineering, mathematics and physics
United States	National Medal of Technology and Innovation	President of the United States	American inventors and innovators who have made significant contributions to the development of new and important technology
United States	Nierenberg Prize	Scripps Institution of Oceanography	Outstanding contributions to science in the public interest
United States	Percy L. Julian Award	National Organization for the Professional Advancement of Black Chemists and Chemical Engineers	Black scientists who have made significant contributions to the areas of pure or applied research in science or engineering
United States	Phi Beta Kappa Award in Science	Phi Beta Kappa	Significant books in the fields of science and mathematics
United States	Research Parasite Award	Pacific Symposium on Biocomputing	Scientists who study previously published data in ways not anticipated by the researchers who first generated it
United States	Vannevar Bush Award	National Science Foundation	Individual who, through public service activities in science and technology, has made an outstanding contribution toward the welfare of mankind and the Nation

== Asia ==
Country	Award	Sponsor	Notes
Iran	Mustafa Prize	Investment fund and endowments of Mustafa	Iranian science and technology award given every two years to the top scientists of the Islamic world
China	Future Science Prize	Future Forum	Given to outstanding scientist is life sciences, physical science, and mathematics and computer science
China	Highest Science and Technology Award	President of China	Highest scientific award to scientists working in China
China	State Science and Technology Prizes	President of China and Premier of China	Remarkable contributions to scientific and technological progress, and to promote the development of science and technology
Hong Kong, China	Shaw Prize	Shaw Prize Foundation	Outstanding contributions in academic and scientific research or applications
India	G. D. Birla Award for Scientific Research	K. K. Birla Foundation	Outstanding scientific research by an Indian scientist who is below the age of 50 in India
India	H K Firodia awards	H K Firodia Foundation	Lifetime achievement in the field of science & technology and a second award is given to a young and promising scientist
India	Infosys Prize	Infosys Science Foundation	Outstanding achievements of contemporary researchers and scientists across six categories : Engineering and Computer Sciences, Humanities, Life Sciences, Mathematical Sciences, Physical Sciences and Social Sciences
India	VASVIK Industrial Research Award	Vividhlaxi Audyogik Samshodhan Vikas Kendra (VASVIK)	Excellence in industry based research in the fields of science and technology across eight categories : Agriculture, Biology, Chemistry, Environmental Science, Electrical & Electronic, Mechanical & Structural, Information & Communication and Materials Sciences
India	Om Prakash Bhasin Award	Shri Om Prakash Bhasin Foundation	Excellence in the areas of science and technology across five categories: Agriculture, Biotechnology, Electronics & Information Technology, Engineering and Medicine
India	Shanti Swarup Bhatnagar Prize for Science and Technology	Council of Scientific and Industrial Research	Notable and outstanding research, applied or fundamental across seven categories: Biology, Chemistry, Environmental Science, Engineering, Mathematics, Medicine and Physics
India	Rashtriya Vigyan Puraskar	Govt. of India	Highly impactful research, discovery and innovation in various fields of science and technology
India	Vigyan Gaurav Award	Council of Science and Technology, Government of Uttar Pradesh	Lifetime achievement award for scientific research
Israel	Dan David Prize	Dan David Foundation and Tel Aviv University	Outstanding contribution in the fields of science, technology, culture or social welfare
Israel	Harvey Prize	Technion – Israel Institute of Technology	Breakthroughs in science and technology
Israel	Wolf Prize	Wolf Foundation	Living scientists and artists for achievements in the interest of mankind and friendly relations among people
Japan	Japan Prize	Japan Prize Foundation	Original and outstanding achievements in science and technology recognized as having advanced the frontiers of knowledge and served the cause of peace and prosperity for mankind
Japan	Kyoto Prize	Inamori Foundation	Lifetime achievement in the arts and sciences
Japan	Saruhashi Prize	Association for the Bright Future of Women Scientists	Japanese female researcher in the natural sciences
Saudi Arabia	King Faisal International Prize	King Faisal Foundation	Dedicated men and women whose contributions make a positive difference (for science)
South Korea	Ho-Am Prize in Engineering	Samsung	Covers the entire field of basic engineering and applied technology, and is presented to people of Korean heritage whose accomplishments have contributed to the development of industry for greater prosperity for humanity
South Korea	Ho-Am Prize in Science	Samsung	Individuals of Korean heritage who have furthered the welfare of humanity through distinguished accomplishments in the field of science
South Korea	Korea Engineering Award	Ministry of Science and ICT and the National Research Foundation of Korea	Given annually to up to four South Koreans and Korean engineers working in domestic universities or research positions and is presented with the Korea Science Award
South Korea	Korea Science Award	Ministry of Science and ICT and the National Research Foundation of Korea	South Koreans and Korean scientists working in domestic universities or research positions
South Korea	Kyung-Ahm Prize	Kyung-Ahm Education & Cultural Foundation	Creative and committed efforts of scholars, experts and artists who significantly contribute to the development of our society through their scholarly research and cultural activities
South Korea	National Academy of Sciences Award	National Academy of Sciences of the Republic of Korea	South Korean nationals who have made significant contributions to academic development through intensive research on a specific topic
South Korea	National Scientist of the Republic of Korea	Ministry of Education, Science and Technology	To achieve the world's best research results by providing annual research funds
South Korea	POSCO TJ Park Prize	POSCO TJ Park Foundation (ko)	"Encourage national interest and participation in creativity, talent development, sacrifice, and volunteerism, contributing to the country's development"
South Korea	Samil Prize	Samil Foundation	The first privately awarded academic and cultural award of South Korea. The name "Samil" is directly translated from the words "three" and "one", which refers to the March First Movement which occurred during the Korean independence movement.
South Korea	Scientist of the Month	Ministry of Science and ICT, National Research Foundation of Korea, Sedaily	National award presented to South Koreans and Korean diaspora
South Korea	Scientist of the Year Award	Korea Science Journalists Association (ko)	Scientists in recognition of their scientific excellence and their contributions to the development of science in Korea
South Korea	Top Scientist and Technologist Award of Korea	Korean Federation of Science and Technology Societies (ko)	Fosters honor and pride and create an environment in which people can focus on research and development by discovering and encouraging scientists and engineers with outstanding achievements who can represent South Korea
South Korea	Young Scientist Award	Korean Academy of Science and Technology	Young scientists under the age of 40 with research and development achievements in the natural sciences and engineering fields
Taiwan	National Invention and Creation Award	President of Taiwan	Reward individuals researching new creations related to inventions, utility models or designs to facilitate the development of Taiwan's industry and technology.
Taiwan	Presidential Science Prize	Taiwan Intellectual Property Office	Reward scholars who have made innovative and outstanding contributions to international academic research
Taiwan	Taiwan Outstanding Women in Science Awards	L'Oréal & Wu Chien-Shiung Education Foundation	Encourage Taiwanese women to participate in science and praise outstanding female scientists
Taiwan	The Executive Yuan Award for Outstanding Science and Technology Contribution	Executive Yuan	Encourage the engagement in research and development work in order to make greater contributions to the nation and society.
Taiwan	Tsungming Tu Award	National Science and Technology Council (Taiwan)	Recognize scholars and experts who have made outstanding contributions to society and have a passion for international academic cooperation in their professional academic fields abroad, and to enhance the international cooperation capabilities and international academic standing of Taiwan.
Vietnam	Hồ Chí Minh Prize	Government of Vietnam	Cultural and/or scientific achievement
Vietnam	VinFuture Prize	VinFuture Foundation	Science and technology breakthrough research and technological innovations that positively improve the quality of human life, and create a more equitable and sustainable world for future generations

== Europe ==
Country	Award	Sponsor	Notes
Albania	Governor's Award	Bank of Albania	Undergraduate dissertation of high scientific standards concerning crucial issues related to the Bank of Albania and issues related to the macroeconomic and financial frames of the state
Austria	Wilhelm Exner Medal	Österreichischer Gewerbeverein	Scientists and researchers who have had a direct impact on business and industry through their scientific achievements and contributions
Belgium	Francqui Prize	Francqui Foundation	Achievements of a scholar or scientist, under 50, in exact sciences, social sciences or humanities, or biological or medical sciences
Europe	European Inventor Award	European Patent Office	Inventors who have made a significant contribution to innovation, economy and society in Europe
Finland	Millennium Technology Prize	Technology Academy Finland	For innovations that have a favorable and sustainable impact on quality of life and well-being of people
France	Grande Médaille	French Academy of Sciences	Researcher who has contributed decisively to the development of science
Germany	Dannie Heineman Prize	Göttingen Academy of Sciences and Humanities	Excellent recently published publications in a new research field, for younger researchers in natural sciences or mathematics
Germany	Leibniz Prize	German Research Foundation	Exceptional scientists and academics for their outstanding achievements in the field of research
Germany	Humboldt Prize	Alexander von Humboldt Foundation	Internationally renowned scientists and scholars who work outside of Germany
Germany	Otto Hahn Medal	Max Planck Society	Young scientists and researchers in both the natural and social sciences
Germany	Werner von Siemens Ring	Werner von Siemens Ring Foundation	People who have promoted the technical sciences through their achievements or, as representatives of science, have opened up new paths through their research into technology
Netherlands	Spinoza Prize	The Dutch Research Council (NWO)	Annually to three or four researchers working in the Netherlands who according to international standards belong to the absolute top of science
Netherlands	Stevin Prize	The Dutch Research Council (NWO)	Annually to researchers or a team of two to three researchers who have achieved an exceptional success in the area of knowledge exchange and impact for society
Norway	Gunnerus Sustainability Award	Royal Norwegian Society of Sciences and Letters	Outstanding contribution to sustainable science within the fields of natural sciences, social sciences, humanities, or technological sciences, either through interdisciplinary work or through work within one of these fields
Norway	Kavli Prize	Norwegian Academy of Science and Letters, Ministry of Education and Research, and Kavli Foundation	Outstanding scientific work in the fields of astrophysics, nanoscience and neuroscience
Poland	Prize of the Foundation for Polish Science	Foundation for Polish Science	Renowned scientists for significant advancements and scientific discoveries which shift cognitive boundaries and open new perspectives for research
Poland, Germany	Copernicus Award	Foundation for Polish Science and Deutsche Forschungsgemeinschaft	Individuals most active in Polish-German scientific cooperation who have made exceptional research achievements as a result of that cooperation
Portugal	Pessoa Prize	Expresso	Portuguese person who has distinguished him or herself as a figure in scientific, artistic, or literary life
Russia	Demidov Prize	Russian Academy of Sciences	Outstanding achievements in natural sciences and humanities
Russia	Lomonosov Gold Medal	Russian Academy of Sciences	Outstanding achievements in the natural sciences and the humanities
Soviet Union	Lenin Prize	Government of the Soviet Union	Accomplishments relating to science, literature, arts, architecture, and technology (no longer awarded)
Spain	Princess of Asturias Awards	Felipe VI of Spain	Research in the field of mathematics, astronomy and astrophysics, physics, chemistry, life sciences, medical sciences, earth and space sciences or technological sciences
Sweden	Crafoord Prize	Royal Swedish Academy of Sciences	Prize for astronomy and mathematics; geosciences; biosciences, with particular emphasis on ecology and polyarthritis
Switzerland	Balzan Prize	International Balzan Prize Foundation	Outstanding achievements in the fields of humanities, natural sciences, culture, as well as for endeavours for peace and the brotherhood of man
Switzerland	Marcel Benoist Prize	Marcel Benoist Foundation	Scientist of Swiss nationality or residency who has made the most useful scientific discovery
United Kingdom	Cherry Kearton Medal and Award	Royal Geographical Society	Traveller concerned with the study or practice of natural history, with a preference for those with an interest in nature photography, art or cinematography
United Kingdom	Duncan Davies Medal	Research and Development Society	an individual who has made an outstanding contribution toward making the UK the best-performing research and development environment in the world
United Kingdom	Gunning Victoria Jubilee Prize	Royal Society of Edinburgh	Original work by scientists resident in or connected with Scotland
United Kingdom	Makdougall Brisbane Prize	Royal Society of Edinburgh	Particular distinction in the promotion of scientific research, awarded sequentially to research workers in the Physical Sciences, Engineering Sciences and Biological Sciences
United Kingdom	Progress Medal	Royal Photographic Society	Important advance in the scientific or technological development of photography or imaging in the widest sense
United Kingdom	Royal Medal	Royal Society of Edinburgh	People with a Scottish connection, who have achieved distinction and international repute in either Life Sciences, Physical and Engineering Sciences, Arts, Humanities and Social Sciences or Business and Commerce
United Kingdom	W. S. Bruce Medal	Royal Geographical Society	Notable contributions to zoology, botany, geology, meteorology, oceanography or geography, where new knowledge has been gained through a personal visit to polar regions

== Oceania ==
Country	Award	Sponsor	Notes
Australia	David Syme Research Prize	University of Melbourne	Best original research work in biology, physics, chemistry or geology in Australia
Australia	Edgeworth David Medal	Royal Society of New South Wales	Distinguished contributions by a young scientist under the age of 35 years for work done predominantly in Australia or which contributed to the advancement of Australian science
Australia	James Cook Medal	Royal Society of New South Wales	Outstanding contributions to science and human welfare in and for the Southern Hemisphere
Australia	Matthew Flinders Medal and Lecture	Australian Academy of Science	Exceptional research by Australian scientists in the physical sciences
Australia	Prime Minister's Prizes for Science	Prime Minister of Australia	Outstanding achievements in scientific research, innovation, and teaching
Australia	RSV Medal for Excellence in Scientific Research	Royal Society of Victoria	Peak career achievements by scientists
Australia	RSV Young Scientist Research Prizes	Royal Society of Victoria	Early career researchers in science
Australia	SA Scientist of the Year	South Australia government	Eminence in science
Australia	Eureka Award	Australian Museum	Rewards excellence in the fields of research & innovation, leadership, science engagement, and school science
Australia	Pearcey Award	Pearcey Foundation	The Pearcey Medal is awarded annually to the individual who has made the greatest lifetime achievement and contribution to the ICT profession and industry in Australia
Australia	iAwards	Australian Information Industry Association	To recognise public and private sector organisations that had achieved business excellence through the application of information technology
Australia, New Zealand	ANZAAS Medal	Australian and New Zealand Association for the Advancement of Science	Advancement of science, or administration and organisation of scientific activities, or teaching of science
Australia, New Zealand	Mueller Medal	Australian and New Zealand Association for the Advancement of Science	Important contributions to anthropological, botanical, geological or zoological science, preferably with special reference to Australia
New Zealand	Marsden Medal	New Zealand Association of Scientists	For a lifetime of outstanding service to the cause or profession of science
New Zealand	Rutherford Medal	Royal Society of New Zealand	Exceptional contributions to the advancement and promotion of public awareness, knowledge and understanding in any field of science, mathematics, social science, or technology

== See also ==
- Lists of awards
- Lists of science and technology awards
- List of years in science
