= Jacek Oleksyn =

Polish biologist

- Born: April 26, 1953 (age 73); Legnica, Polish People's Republic
- Education: Leningrad State Forest Technical University
- Occupation: biologist
- Known for: research on tree biology and forestry
- Awards: Poland - U.S. Science Award Award (2018); Prize of the Foundation for Polish Science (2008)

Jacek Oleksyn (Polish pronunciation: [ˈja.t͡sɛk ɔlɛksɨn]; born 26 April 1953, Legnica) is a Polish biologist specializing in tree biology and forestry, Professor of Biological Sciences, director of the Institute of Dendrology at the Polish Academy of Sciences (PAN) in Kórnik, a corresponding member of PAN.

== Life and scientific career ==
He graduated from the Leningrad State Forest Technical University. In 1982, he obtained a doctoral degree in biological sciences from the Silesian University in Katowice. In 1994, he received a habilitation in forest sciences from the University of Life Sciences in Poznań. On 20 August 2002, he was awarded the title of professor.

His area of research focuses on ecology, ecophysiology of land plants and ecosystems as well as local and global environmental changes. He is the author of more than 120 research papers published in various science journals including Nature and PNAS (Proceedings of the National Academy of Sciences of the United States of America).

Since 1976, he has been working at the Institute of Dendrology of the Polish Academy of Sciences in Kórnik, Greater Poland Voivodeship, where he conducts research on the ecophysiology of plants. Between 1996–1999, he was director of the Department of Ecology, and in 2011, he was appointed head of the Institute of Ecophysiology.

Between 1988–1991, he was a Fellow of the Fulbright Program. In the years 1988–2012, he worked as a visiting professor at various American universities including the University of Arizona (1988–1989), the University of Wisconsin-Madison (1989–1991) and the University of Minnesota (1991–2012).

Since 2007, he has been a corresponding member of the Polish Academy of Sciences and since 2012, he has been a member of the Botany Committee and Forest Science Committee of PAN.

In 2008, he was awarded Prize of the Foundation for Polish Science in the category of life sciences for his "contribution to the discovery of the universal, bio-geographic correlations between plant characteristics, that are fundamental for understanding ecological processes on a global scale". In 2018, he received jointly with Peter B. Reich the Poland-U.S. Science Award for their research on the relationships between plants and global climate change.

== Selected publications ==
- Linking leaf and root traits to ecosystem structure and function in a common garden study of 14 temperate tree species. Project financed by the National Science Foundation (USA), Ecosystem Studies Program, April 2001 – March 2002. Collatorative research: Reich P.B., Hobbie S.E., Oleksyn J.,.
- Defense strategies of woody plants with differential shade tolerance to grazing by folivorous insects. Project financed by the Committee for Scientific Investigations (Poland), October 2004 - October 2007. (Giertych M.J., Karolewski P., Żytkowiak R., Oleksyn J.).
- Mechanisms and factors recompensing damage of Pinus sylvestris and Fagus sylvatica seedlings growing in different light conditions and competition with grasses. Project financed by the Committee for Scientific Investigations (Poland), October 2006 – November 2008. (Oleksyn J., Guździoł E.).
- Role of the root system diversity in oak decline. Ministry of Science and Higher Education. 2010–2011. (Zadworny M., Jagodziński A., Łakomy P., Oleksyn J., Ufnalski K.).
- Cold adaptation drives variability in needle structure and anatomy in Pinus sylvestris L. along a 1900 km temperate‐boreal transect. Article, Jul 2017, Functional Ecology; Artur Jankowski, Tomasz Wyka, Roma Żytkowiak, Jacek Oleksyn.

== See also ==
- List of Poles
- Copernicus Award
