= Tomasz Giaro =

Polish lawyer (born 1951)

- Born: 1951 (age 74–75); Wrocław, Polish People's Republic
- Education: University of Warsaw
- Occupation: lawyer
- Awards: Prize of the Foundation for Polish Science (2011)

Tomasz Giaro (born 1951 in Wrocław) is a Polish lawyer specializing in Roman law, theory, philosophy and history of law as well as comparative law; a Professor of Legal Sciences and dean of the Faculty of Law and Administration of the University of Warsaw.

== Life and career ==
He studied law under Henryk Kupiszewski and Max Kaser and graduated from the University of Warsaw (UW) in 1972. Since 1973, he has been working at the Faculty of Law and Administration at the UW. In 1978, he obtained a doctoral degree in legal science on the basis of his dissertation entitled Excusatio necessitatis in Roman Law. He won the Alexander von Humboldt Foundation scholarship and conducted research at the University of Bonn between 1984 and 1985. In 1988, he received a habilitation from the University of Warsaw based on his scientific achievements as well as work entitled Dogmatische Wahrheit und Zeitlosigkeit in der römischen Jurisprudenz. In the years 1990–2006, he worked at the Max Planck Institute for European Legal History in Frankfurt. During his stay in Germany he worked as a lecturer at the Faculty of Law of the Goethe University Frankfurt and the Free University of Berlin. In 2006, he returned to the University of Warsaw. Since 2007, he has been a member of the Committee on Ancient Cultures at the Polish Academy of Sciences as well as the Foreign Languages School of the UW. Between 2007 and 2008, he was an academic teacher at the Silesian University in Katowice.

In 2009, he was granted the title of professor at the University of Warsaw. In 2011, he was appointed deputy director of the Committee on Legal Sciences at the Polish Academy of Sciences. In the same year, he became the laureate of Poland's top science award, Prize of the Foundation for Polish Science, "for an interdisciplinary analysis of the category of truth in the doctrines of law from antiquity to the present – opening new prospects for understanding of the law as one of the foundations of European civilization".

He is also a member of the Programme Council for magazines: UKSW Legal Journals ("Zeszyty Prawnicze UKSW") and Legal Forum ("Forum Prawnicze") as well as the Russian magazine Civilisticheskije issledovanja. He is one of the judges of the annual scientific contest organized by the weekly magazine Polityka.

In May 2016, he was appointed dean of the Faculty of Law at the University of Warsaw (2016–2020). He is an author of 155 publications in the Polish, English, German, French, Italian and Russian language.

== Selected publications ==
- Excusatio necessitatis nel diritto romano, Warsaw, 1982
- Aktualisierung Europas. Gesprache mit Paul Koschaker, Geneva, 2000
- Le radici comuni del diritto europeo: un cambiamento di prospettiva, (co-authors: Pier Giorgio Monateri and Alessandro Somma), Rome, 2005
- Modernisierung durch Transfer im 19. und frühen 20. Jahrhundert (editor), Frankfurt, 2006
- Modernisierung durch Transfer zwischen den Weltkriegen (editor), Frankfurt, 2007
- Römische Rechtswahrheiten: ein Gedankenexperiment, Frankfurt, 2007
- Prawo rzymskie. U podstaw prawa prywatnego, (co-authors: Wojciech Dajczak and Franciszek Longchamps de Bérier), Warsaw, 2009
- Skuteczność prawa (editor), Warsaw, 2010
- Prawo w dobie globalizacji (editor), Warsaw, 2011
- Roman Law and Legal Knowledge Studies in Memory of Henryk Kupiszewski, SAWPIAUW, Warsaw, 2011

== See also ==
- Polish Academy of Sciences
- Copernicus Award
