= Tomasz Czyszanowski =

Tomasz Grzegorz Czyszanowski
- Title: Professor of Physical Sciences

Academic background
- Education: PhD: Physics, 2004, Łódź University of Technology Habilitation: Physics, 2012, Wrocław University of Science and Technology Professorship: 2019

Academic work
- Discipline: Photonics, optoelectronics, semiconductor lasers
- Institutions: Łódź University of Technology: Since 2000

Tomasz Grzegorz Czyszanowski is a Polish physicist, professor of physical sciences, and academic teacher at the Łódź University of Technology. He specializes in photonics and optoelectronics, particularly in the modeling and design of semiconductor lasers and subwavelength photonic structures. He heads the Photonics Research Group at the Institute of Physics of Łódź University of Technology.

== Biography ==
He graduated in physics from Łódź University of Technology. In 2004, he obtained a PhD in physical sciences; in 2012, he earned a habilitation degree at Wrocław University of Science and Technology; and in 2019, he was awarded the title of professor.

He worked at CFD Research Corporation in Huntsville, Alabama, USA, and completed postdoctoral fellowships at Vrije Universiteit Brussel. He has been professionally affiliated with Łódź University of Technology throughout his academic career.

== Scientific activity ==
Czyszanowski specializes in photonics, optoelectronics, and semiconductor laser physics. His research focuses on VCSEL lasers (Vertical-Cavity Surface-Emitting Lasers), photonic structures, optical metastructures, and the numerical modeling of optoelectronic devices.

He has co-developed concepts including monolithic high refractive-index-contrast subwavelength gratings, quantum cascade lasers with vertical resonant cavities, metastructured transmission electrodes, and VCSEL lasers employing wave chaos.

He was awarded the START Programme scholarship (2004) and the KOLUMB Programme grant of the Foundation for Polish Science (2006). He has also led numerous research projects conducted in collaboration with Polish and international research institutions.
