= Ewa Kamler =

Polish biologist

- Born: 18 January 1937 (age 89); Warsaw, Second Polish Republic
- Education: University of Warsaw
- Occupation: biologist
- Known for: research on ichthyology and hydrobiology
- Awards: Prize of the Foundation for Polish Science (1992)

Ewa Kamler (born 18 January 1937, Warsaw) is a Polish biologist and ichthyologist, Professor of Natural Sciences specializing in the fields of ecology, hydrobiology and zoology.

== Life and career ==
She graduated from the Juliusz Słowacki High School No. 7 in Warsaw and subsequently from the Faculty of Biology and Earth Sciences of the University of Warsaw. In 1965, she obtained a doctoral degree at the Nicolaus Copernicus University in Toruń. In 1977, she received her habilitation from the Institute of Ecology of the Polish Academy of Sciences (PAN). On 9 March 1992, she obtained the title of Professor of Natural Sciences.

In 1958, she began to work at the Warsaw University of Technology. Between 1962 and 1974, she worked at the Institute of Experimental Biology of the Polish Academy of Sciences. She also worked at the Institute of Ecology (PAN), International Center of Ecology, as well as the Inland Fisheries Institute.

She is one of the founders of the Polish Hydrobiological Society and a member of International Society of Limnology, European Ichthyological Union and European Association of Science Editors. She has been awarded numerous prizes including Warsaw University of Technology Rector's Prize (1961), and Poland's top scientific award Prize of the Foundation for Polish Science (1992) in the field of the life sciences and medicine for her seminal work entitled Early Life History of Fish: An Energetics Approach.

== Other distinctions ==
- Knight's Cross of the Order of Polonia Restituta (1996)
- Officer's Cross of the Order of Polonia Restituta (2011)

== See also ==
- Prize of the Foundation for Polish Science
- Copernicus Award
- List of Poles
