= Andrzej Szczeklik =

Polish immunologist (1938–2012)

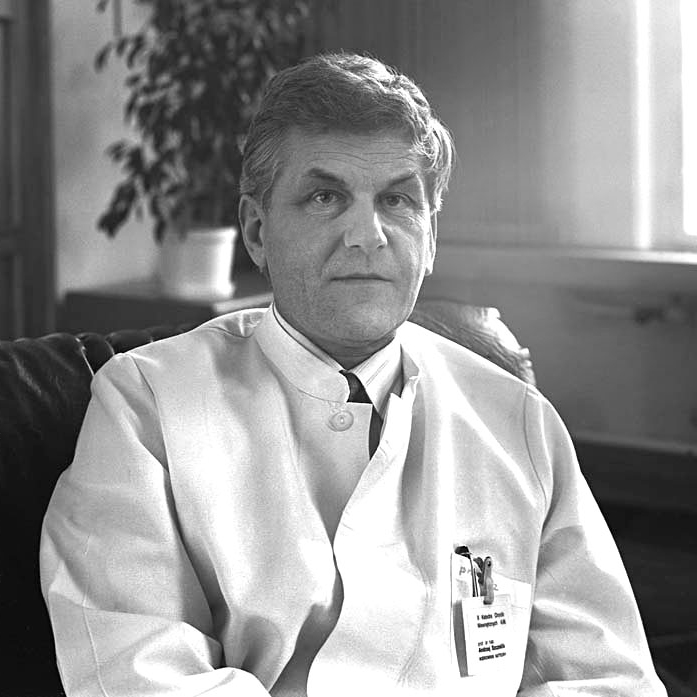
- Born: July 29, 1938; Kraków, Poland
- Died: February 3, 2012 (aged 73)
- Education: Jagiellonian University
- Known for: Aspirin-induced asthma
- Awards: Prize of the Foundation for Polish Science (1998)
- Scientific career
- Fields: Medicine, Immunology

Andrzej Szczeklik (July 29, 1938 – February 3, 2012) was a Polish immunologist working at the Jagiellonian University School of Medicine (Collegium Medicum) in Kraków. Having received numerous distinctions for his research, Szczeklik was also well known as a writer.

He received his graduate degree from the Jagiellonian University, and after completing his one-year internship in the USA he worked for seven years at the Academy of Medicine in Wrocław. He completed his postgraduate training abroad; at the Karolinska Institutet in Stockholm and University of Uppsala, Sweden as well as at the University of North Carolina, Chapel Hill, USA.

In 1979 he became chairman of Department of Medicine, Jagiellonian University School of Medicine in Kraków. In 1990-1993 he was elected the Rector (President) of the Copernicus Academy of Medicine in Cracow, and then Vice-Rector of the Jagiellonian University for Medical Affairs (1993–1996).

Szczeklik's main research interest included: cardiopulmonary diseases, aspirin-induced asthma, chemical mediators in diseases of circulatory and respiratory systems with special reference to eicosanoids.

Szczeklik has been lecturing extensively in major European, American and Japanese universities. He was a visiting professor at the Faculty of Medicine of the University of Sheffield, UK, King's College School of Medicine, London, UK and Hochgebirgsklinik Davos-Wolfgang, Switzerland.

== Research ==
Szczeklik's scientific interest concentrated on heart and lung diseases. In 1976, he was involved in the discovery of prostacyclin, done by Salvador Moncada and Ryszard Gryglewski. He is perceived as an expert on aspirin-sensitive asthma. For the research on asthma he received "Lancet Investigators Award" in 1997 (together with Marek Sanak). For discovering the anti-thrombotic properties of aspirin he was awarded Prize of the Foundation for Polish Science in 1998.

He is an author and co-author of about 600 papers published in the leading biomedical journals, including: Nature, The Lancet, New England Journal of Medicine, Journal of Clinical Investigation, British Medical Journal, Blood, Circulation, Journal of Allergy and Clinical Immunology, etc. He is also author and co-author and co-editor of several international and Polish medical textbooks.

== Non-academic involvement ==
Szczeklik published three largely successful and well received books: "Katharsis", 2002 (published in Polish, English, Hungarian, Spanish), "Kore", and "Nieśmiertelność" (Immortality), all of which contained his philosophical reflections on life and medicine and aimed to set his scientific stance in a broader landscape.

== Membership in societies and awards ==
Szczeklik is a member of numerous scientific societies, such as the Pontifical Academy of Sciences in the Vatican and Royal College of Physicians in London, UK (honorary member), American Academy of Allergy Asthma and Immunology, European Academy of Allergy Clinical Immunology, European Respiratory Society, International Society of Thrombosis Haemostasis, Polish Academy of Sciences.

In 1995 Szczeklik was awarded with "Gloria Medicinae" a medal of Polish Society of Medicine. In 1997 he received first prize of "The Lancet" for the paper reporting on genetic polymorphism of leukotriene C4 synthase. In 1998 he received the scientific prize of the Royal College of Physicians, London and was elected to the College. In the same year he received the first award of "The Polish Science Foundation" for his studies on mechanism of action of aspirin. In 2001 he was awarded the gold medal and "The Robert A. Cook Memorial Lectureship" by American Academy Allergy Asthma and Immunology. From 1999 to 2003 he received honorary doctorates from University Schools of Medicine in Wrocław, Warsaw, Katowice and Łódź. In 2007 he was awarded Fellowship by American College of Physicians.

== Honorary degrees ==
- Wrocław Medical University (1999)
- Medical University of Warsaw (2002)
- Medical University of Silesia (2002)
- Medical University of Łódź (2003
- Jagiellonian University in Kraków (2009)

== See also ==
- Szczeklik's biography on his private website
