= Marian Biskup =

Polish historian, author and academic

- Born: December 19, 1922; Inowroclaw
- Died: April 16, 2012 (aged 89); Toruń
- Awards: Prize of the Foundation for Polish Science (1992)

Marian Biskup (December 19, 1922 – April 16, 2012) was a Polish historian, author and academic, who specialized in the history of the Baltics, Pomerelia, Teutonic Order, Prussia, Toruń and Copernicus. He was a member of the International Commission for the study of the Teutonic Order.

== Biography ==
Biskup was born in Inowroclaw. He wrote on a number of historical subjects and particularly Nicholas Copernicus. Biskup was known for his work on the history of Toruń.
