= Ludomir Newelski =

Polish mathematician

Ludomir Newelski (born 27 November 1960, Wrocław) is a Polish mathematician, specializing in model theory, set theory, foundations of mathematics, and universal algebra.

He attended the 14th High School in Wrocław, where in April 1977, as a second-year student, he became one of the first laureates of the Polish Mathematical Olympiad in this school. He studied and graduated in mathematics at the University of Wrocław and then worked at the Mathematical Institute of the Polish Academy of Sciences (PAN). At PAN he received his PhD in 1987 and habilitated in 1991. He worked at PAN until 1994 and then moved to the University of Wrocław, where he now works. He obtained the rank of full professor in 1998. From 2007 to 2016 Newelski was the director of the Mathematical Institute of the University of Wrocław.

Newelski was an Invited Speaker at the International Congress of Mathematicians in 1998 in Berlin. He was the winner of the Prize of the Foundation for Polish Science in the field of exact sciences in 2001 "for work in the field of mathematical logic constituting a breakthrough in model theory and algebra".

== Selected publications ==
- Newelski, Ludomir; Pawlikowski, Janusz; Seredyński, Witold (1987). "Infinite free set for small measure set mappings". Proceedings of the American Mathematical Society. 100 (2): 335. doi:10.1090/S0002-9939-1987-0884475-3.
- Newelski, Ludomir (1987). "On the number of squares in a group". Proceedings of the American Mathematical Society. 99 (2): 213. doi:10.1090/S0002-9939-1987-0870773-6.
- Newelski, L.; Rosłanowski, A. (1993). "The ideal determined by the unsymmetric game". Proceedings of the American Mathematical Society. 117 (3): 823. doi:10.1090/S0002-9939-1993-1112500-6.
- Newelski, Ludomir (1994). "On $U$-rank $2$ types". Transactions of the American Mathematical Society. 344 (2): 553–581. doi:10.1090/S0002-9947-1994-1142779-1.
- Newelski, Ludomir (1996). "On the prime model property". Proceedings of the American Mathematical Society. 124 (8): 2519–2525. doi:10.1090/S0002-9939-96-03311-4.
- Newelski, Ludomir (2002). "Small profinite structures". Transactions of the American Mathematical Society. 354 (3): 925–944. doi:10.1090/S0002-9947-01-02854-9.
