= Dorothee Haroske =

German mathematician

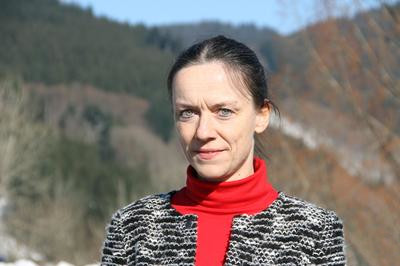
Haroske at Oberwolfach, 2015

Dorothee D. Haroske (born 1968) is a German mathematician who holds the chair for function spaces in the Institute of Mathematics of the University of Jena.

== Education and career ==
Haroske completed her doctorate (Dr. rer. nat.) at the University of Jena in 1995, and her habilitation at Jena in 2002. Her doctoral dissertation, Entropy Numbers and Application Numbers in Weighted Function Space of Type $B^s_{pq}$ and $F^s_{pq}$, Eigenvalue Distributions of Some Degenerate Pseudodifferential Operators, was supervised by Hans Triebel.

In 2018, she was given a chair for function spaces at the University of Rostock before returning to her present position in Jena.

== Books ==
Haroske is the author of the book Envelopes and Sharp Embeddings of Function Spaces (Chapman & Hall, 2007). With Hans Triebel she also wrote Distributions, Sobolev Spaces, Elliptic Equations (EMS Textbooks in Mathematics, European Mathematical Society, 2008).

She is one of the editors of Function Spaces, Differential Operators and Nonlinear Analysis: The Hans Triebel Anniversary Volume (Springer Basel AG, 2003).

== Recognition ==
Haroske and Polish mathematician Leszek Skrzypczak are the recipients of the 2026 Copernicus Award for exceptional achievements in Polish–German scientific cooperation, given for their long collaboration in mathematical analysis.
