= Piotr Ponikowski =

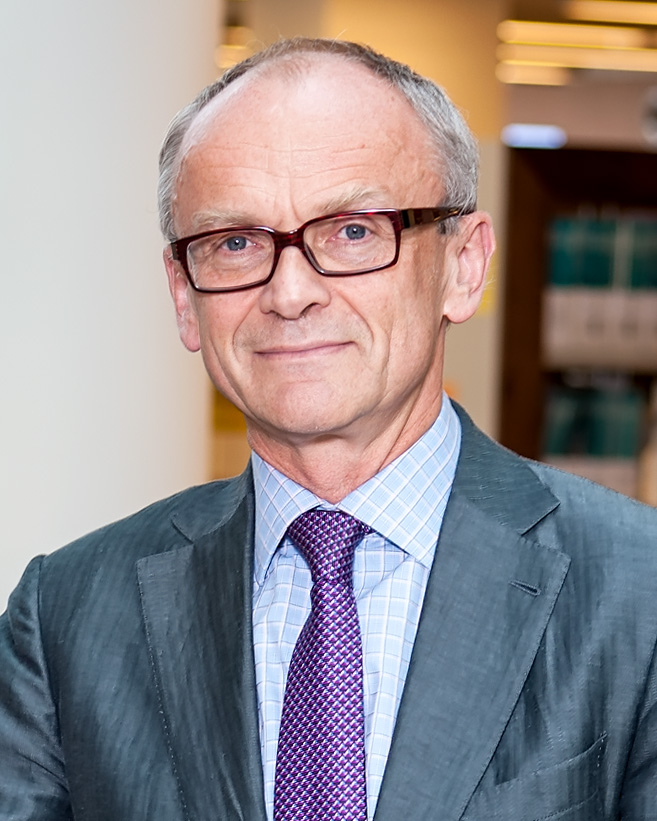
- Born: February 11, 1961 (age 65); Wrocław, Polish People's Republic
- Education: Wrocław Medical University
- Occupation: cardiologist
- Known for: research on heart failure
- Awards: Copernicus Award (2018)

Piotr Ponikowski (born 11 February 1961 in Wrocław) is a Polish cardiologist, Professor of Medical Sciences, and Rector of the Wrocław Medical University and he served as the Head of the Polish Cardiological Society (2017-2019). His scientific interests include research on heart failure, coronary heart disease and heart arrhythmia.

== Life and career ==
He was born on 11 February 1961 in Wrocław, Poland. He graduated from the Faculty of Medicine at the Wrocław Medical University in 1986. He received his habilitation in 1997. In 2002, he obtained the title of professor of medical sciences. In 1997, he began to work at the 4th Military Clinical Hospital in Wrocław and since 2005, he has been the Head of Cardiology Department. Since 2009, he has also been Head of Department of Heart Diseases at the Wrocław Medical University. He has conducted research at such institutions as Karolinska University Hospital in Sweden and Imperial College and Royal Brompton Hospital in London.

He is considered one of the most prominent Polish scientists, having been included in the Thomson Reuters Ranking of The World's Most Influential Scientific Minds 2015. He is an author of more than 700 scientific publications.

Ponikowski is a member of numerous medical associations including the European Society of Cardiology, the Cardiology Committee for Practice, and Polish Cardiological Society. Between 2010 and 2012, he was President of the Heart Failure Association of the European Society of Cardiology. He was the director of many international research projects such as SICA-HF Studies investigating co-morbidities aggravating heart failure (2009-2013). In 2015, he received the President of the City of Wrocław Medal for his scientific achievements. In 2018, he was awarded the Copernicus Award shared with Stefan Anker for their contributions into research on heart failure.

== Selected publications ==
- Ferric Carboxymaltose in Patients with Heart Failure and Iron Deficiency. New England Journal of Medicine. 2009; 361:2436-2448.
- Signature of circulating microRNAs in patients with acute heart failure. European Journal of Heart Failure. 2016
- Calcium upregulation by percutaneous administration of gene therapy in patients with cardiac disease (CUPID 2): a randomised, multinational, double-blind, placebo-controlled, phase 2b trial. Lancet. 2016 Mar 19
- Guidelines for the diagnosis and treatment of acute and chronic heart failure: The Task Force for the diagnosis and treatment of acute and chronic heart failure of the European Society of Cardiology (ESC) Developed with the special contribution of the Heart Failure Association (HFA) of the ESC. European Heart Journal. 2016 May 20

== See also ==
- Universities in Poland
- Science in Poland
- List of Poles
