= Romuald Schild =

Polish archaeologist (1936–2021)

- Born: 2 October 1936; Lwów, Poland
- Died: 23 November 2021 (aged 85); Warsaw, Poland
- Awards: Prize of the Foundation for Polish Science in the area of Humanities and Social Sciences
- Scientific career
- Fields: Archaeology
- Workplaces: Institute of Archeology and Ethnology of the Polish Academy of Sciences

Romuald Schild (2 October 1936 – 23 November 2021) was a Polish archaeologist who was professor for the Institute of Archaeology and Ethnology at the Polish Academy of Sciences. He died on 23 November 2021, at the age of 85.

== Biography ==
He studied at the University of Warsaw (graduated in 1957). After completing his doctorate (1962), he worked at the Institute of the History of Material Culture of the Polish Academy of Sciences in Warsaw (now the Institute of Archaeology and Ethnology); he was habilitated in 1967, in 1978 became an associate professor, and in 1984 a full professor. He was a guest lecturer at Southern Methodist University in Dallas. He was a member of the Committee on Pre- and Protohistoric Sciences of the Polish Academy of Sciences (PAN) and a corresponding member of the Faculty of History and Philosophy of the PAU. In 2020 he received the Prize of the Foundation for Polish Science in the area of Humanities and Social Sciences for indicating climatic and environmental determinants of socio-cultural processes in the Stone Age in areas of North Africa and the European Lowlands.
