= Tomasz Dietl =

Polish physicist

- Born: 1 October 1950 (age 75); Poznań, Poland
- Citizenship: Polish
- Education: University of Warsaw
- Awards: Alexander von Humboldt Research Award (2003); Europhysics Prize (2006); Marian Smoluchowski Medal (2010)
- Scientific career
- Fields: Spintronics
- Workplaces: Polish Academy of Sciences

Tomasz Dietl (born 1 October 1950) is a Polish physicist; professor and head of the Laboratory for Cryogenic and Spintronic Research at the Institute of Physics, Polish Academy of Sciences; and professor of the Institute of Theoretical Physics at the University of Warsaw.

His research interests include semiconductors, spintronics, and nanotechnology. With over 20,000 citations, he is considered a leading Polish physicist.

== Career ==
He graduated from the University of Warsaw at the age of 23 (master's degree) and subsequently obtained his PhD from the Polish Academy of Sciences in 1977. He obtained a habilitation in 1983 and the title of professor in 1990. Since then he has been working in the Institute of Physics of the Polish Academy of Sciences. In 2009, he became a member of the Polish Academy of Learning (PAU) as well as the Warsaw Scientific Society (WTN). He worked as a visiting professor at the Johannes Kepler University Linz (1991–92, 1996–98), Joseph Fourier University (1993-2000) and Tohoku University.

In 2006, he received Poland's top science award, the Prize of the Foundation for Polish Science, "for developing the theory, confirmed in recent years, of diluted ferromagnetic semiconductors, and for demonstrating new methods in controlling magnetization."

== Personal life ==
He is the son of economist Jerzy Dietl. He is married and has two children.

== Honours and awards ==
- Gold Cross of Merit (1990)
- Maria Skłodowska-Curie Award of the Polish Academy of Sciences (1997)
- Alexander von Humboldt Research Award (2003)
- Fellow of the Institute of Physics, UK (2004)
- Europhysics Prize (with Hideo Ohno and David Awschalom), European Physical Society (2005)
- Prize of the Foundation for Polish Science (2006)
- Marian Smoluchowski Medal of the Polish Physical Society (2010)
- Member of Academia Europaea (2011)
- Commander's Cross of the Order of Polonia Restituta, (2013)
- Fellow of the American Physical Society (2015)
- Tohoku University International Award - Special Award (2025)

== Most influential publications ==
1. Dietl T., Ohno H., Matsukura F., Cibert J., Ferrand D., Zener Model Description of Ferromagnetism in Zinc-Blende Magnetic Semiconductors, Science (2000)

== See also ==
- Science in Poland
