= Ryszard Gryglewski =

Polish pharmacologist (1932–2023)

Ryszard Jerzy Gryglewski
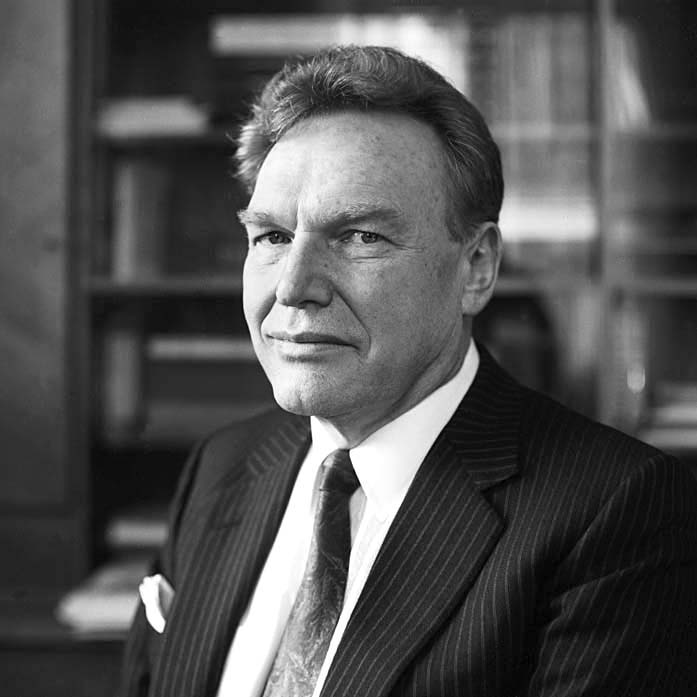
- Born: 4 August 1932; Wilno, Poland (now Vilnius, Lithuania)
- Died: 30 January 2023 (aged 90); Kraków, Poland
- Citizenship: Polish
- Education: Jagiellonian University
- Known for: Discovery of prostacyclin
- Awards: Prize of the Foundation for Polish Science (1997); Sir Hans Krebs Medal (2004)
- Scientific career
- Fields: Pharmacology, medicine

Ryszard Jerzy Gryglewski (Polish: [ˈrɨʂard ˈjɛʐɨ ˈɡrɨɡlɛfskʲi]; 4 August 1932 – 30 January 2023) was a Polish pharmacologist and physician. He is known for co-discovering prostacyclin. He was a Member of the Polish Academy of Learning (PAU) and the Polish Academy of Sciences (PAN). He was the recipient of Sir Hans Krebs Medal as well as Poland's highest order of merit, the Order of the White Eagle.

== Life and career ==
Gryglewski graduated in medicine from the Jagiellonian University in Kraków, where he also wrote his doctorate in Pharmacology and in 1971 became a professor. In 1965, he was appointed as the head of the Department of Pharmacology at the Medical Academy in Kraków. He was a member of many pharmacological associations around the world and since 1993 president of the Jagiellonian Medical Research Centre (Jagiellońskie Centrum Badań Medycznych).

His scientific work concerned experimental pharmacology. His research focused on the contribution of the blood-vascular system in building up immunity against thrombosis in the development of sclerosis. In 1976, together with S. Bunting, J. Vane and S. Moncada, he discovered prostacyclin, which set off many further scientific discoveries.

In 1975, he showed that the inhibition of the release of arachidonic acid represents the mechanisms of action of glucocorticosteroids.7 His study describing discovery of the free radical mediated mechanism underlying the regulation of nitric oxide stability was published in Nature in 1986.

Together with Andrzej Szczeklik, he was involved in the research on the so-called “aspirin-induced asthma” (AIA) and contributed to the concept that this disease is not caused by sensitization to nonsteroidal anti-inflammatory drugs but results from the inhibition of the cyclooxygenase type 1 (COX-1) pathway.

Among his other notable discoveries was that antiplatelet drugs, such as Clopidogrel, exert a strong fibrynolitic effect in the mechanism dependent on the endothelial cells.

Gryglewski died in Kraków on 30 January 2023, at the age of 90.

== Awards and honours ==
In 1997, he was awarded the Prize of the Foundation for Polish Science for a series of studies on the regulation of thromboresistance.

In 2002, he received the Grand Cross of the Order of Polonia Restituta from President Aleksander Kwaśniewski for "outstanding merits in his scientific and didactical work".

In 2004, he received Sir Hans Krebs Medal of the Federation of European Biochemical Societies (FEBS).

On 20 January 2017, he was awarded Poland's highest decoration, the Order of the White Eagle, by President Andrzej Duda for his "distinguished contributions to the development of pharmacology and clinical medicine".

== See also ==
- List of Polish scientists
- Timeline of Polish science and technology

== Sources ==
- RYSZARD GRYGLEWSKI
- Gryglewski awarded honorary degree from Medical University of Łódź
- Gryglewski family history
