= Jadwiga Staniszkis =

Polish sociologist (1942–2024)

Jadwiga Maria Staniszkis
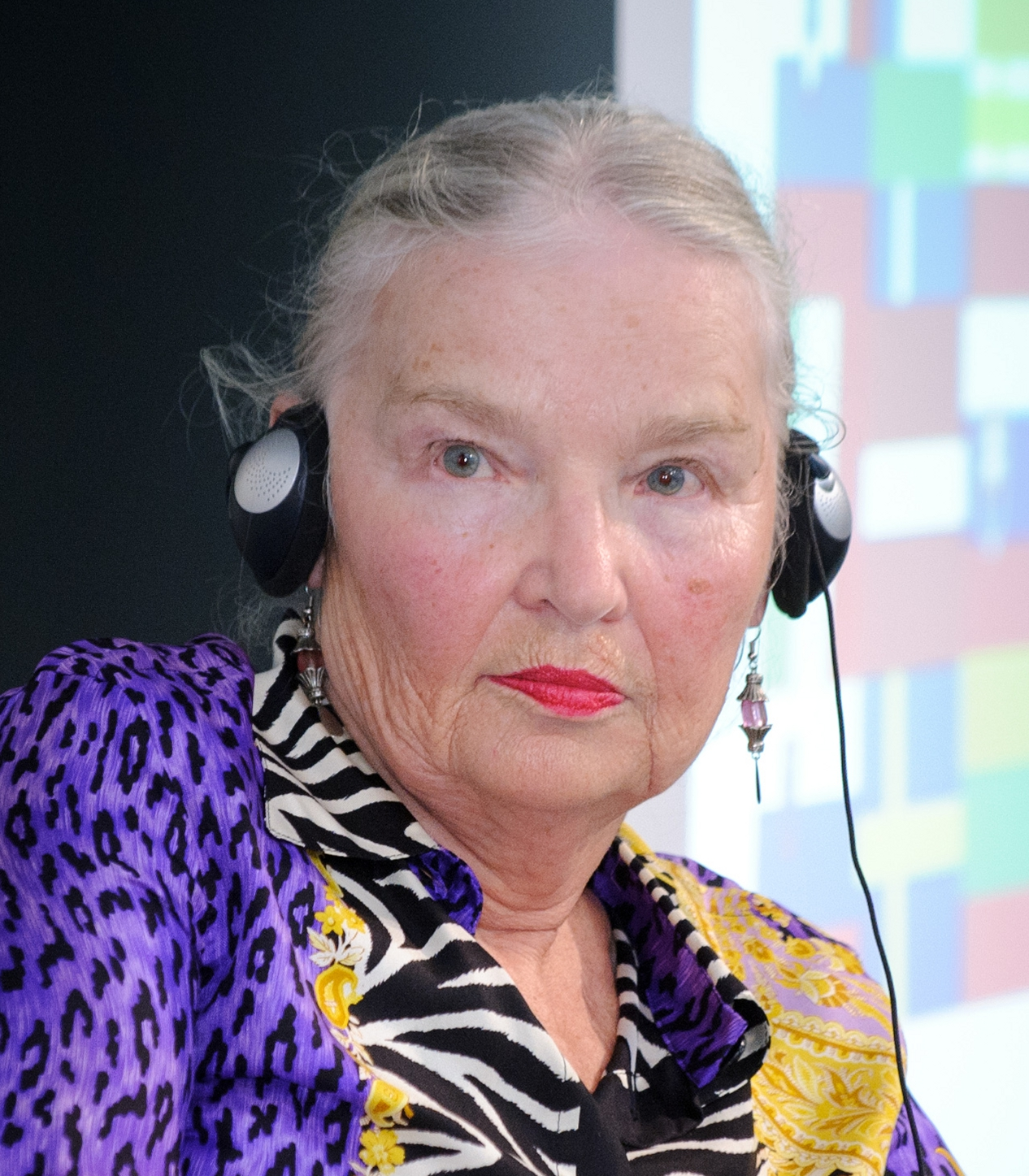
- Born: 26 April 1942; Warsaw, General Government (now Poland)
- Died: 15 April 2024 (aged 81)
- Education: University of Warsaw
- Spouse(s): Marek Lewicki, Michał Korzec
- Partner: Ireneusz Iredyński
- Awards: Prize of the Foundation for Polish Science, Commander's Cross of the Order of Polonia Restituta
- Scientific career
- Fields: Sociology
- Thesis: Patologie struktur organizacyjnych (1971)

Jadwiga Staniszkis (26 April 1942 – 15 April 2024) was a Polish sociologist and political scientist, essayist, a professor at the University of Warsaw and the Wyższa Szkoła Biznesu (Higher Business School), a Polish campus of National-Louis University.

== Biography ==
Staniszkis was the granddaughter of the interwar politician Witold Teofil Staniszkis who was murdered in the Auschwitz concentration camp in 1941 during the German occupation of Poland. Jadwiga Staniszkis studied sociology at the Warsaw University Faculty of Philosophy, obtaining a PhD in 1971 ("Patologie struktur organizacyjnych"). In 1978, she completed her habilitation in the humanities, in the department of sociology. From 1991, she worked as a university professor.

After her graduation, Staniszkis worked at the Department of Sociology at her alma mater. She actively contributed to political life at the university and was dismissed from the university and arrested for seven months for attending the protests of students and intellectuals against the communist government of the People's Republic of Poland during the 1968 Polish political crisis.

Staniszkis was the author of several books on phenomena of socialism. Her first book about the dialectics of socialist society was translated into Japanese, but the Polish manuscript was confiscated by the secret service (SB) and lost. Her second book on the Solidarity movement has never been translated to Polish due to controversy, although it was published in French (two years before the 'original' English edition). The fate of her book about the dynamics of transformation in Poland was similar, as it has not been published in Poland. Most of her works have been published since the transformation of the political system in Poland.

In 2021, Jadwiga Staniszkis withdrew from public life. In October 2023 her daughter, Joanna, revealed that she was struggling with Alzheimer's disease. She died from complications of the disease on 15 April 2024 at the age of 81.

== Awards ==
In 2004 Staniszkis was awarded the Prize of the Foundation for Polish Science, called the "Polish Nobel Prize" in Poland. On 31 August 2006, President Lech Kaczyński awarded her the Commander's Cross of the Order of Polonia Restituta.

== Works ==
- Poland's Self-Limiting Revolution (1984)
- "Forms of Reasoning as Ideology". Telos 66 (Winter 1985–86). New York: Telos Press.
- The Dynamics of the Breakthrough in Eastern Europe: The Polish Experience. Berkeley, California: University of Berkeley Press, 1991.
- The Ontology of Socialism (1992)
- Post-communism: Emerging Enigma (1999)
- "The Epistemologies of Order: An Inquiry Into Genesis, Clashes and Collapse", in J. Koltan (ed.) Solidarity and the Crisis of Trust, Gdansk: European Solidarity Centre, 2016, pp. 95–120 (http://www.ecs.gda.pl/title,pid,1471.html).
