= Maria Staniszkis =

Polish lawyer

Maria Staniszkis (born October 20, 1911, died on December 4, 2004) was a Polish lawyer, legal counsel, member of the ONR. In 1936, she headed the propaganda section of the District Department of Sokołów Mazowieckie District TG "Sokół". After the war, she co-founded the Association of Legal Advisors in Poland. In 1983, she became the first head of the Legal Advisers Research Center.
