= Merefnebef =

- Vizier of Egypt
- Tenure: c. 2332 BC
- Wife: Sesheshet
- Burial: Saqqara, Egypt

Merefnebef, also called Unisankh and Fefi (fl. c. 2332 BC), was a vizier from the Sixth Dynasty of Egypt. He first served at the court of Teti, possibly became vizier during the reign of Userkare, and was dismissed during the reign of Pepi I.

== Biography ==
Merefnebef was a hereditary prince and count. He served as a treasurer of the King of Lower Egypt, and held positions which placed him close to the king. He was a keeper of the head ornaments, and was privy to the secrets of the House of the Morning. Some of his titles say he was a guard and priest of Teti's pyramid. He may have become a vizier late in his career and those titles are recorded on the façade of his tomb.

== Tomb ==
The mastaba of Merefnebef is located to the west of the Step Pyramid of Djoser. It is relatively small, but fully decorated. The burial chamber contained a sarcophagus with a lid. The scenes in the tomb show deliberate destruction. At least one of Merefnebef's sons had his fathers' and brothers images removed, as well as altering his father's titles in particular those of "Honoured by the king" by erasing the word "king" or even replacing it with the word "desert".

== Literature ==
K. Myśliwiec et al.ː The Tomb of Merefnebef, Parts 1–2, Warsaw 2004. (the full publication of the vizier's tomb)
