= Krzysztof Palczewski =

Polish-American biochemist and pharmacologist

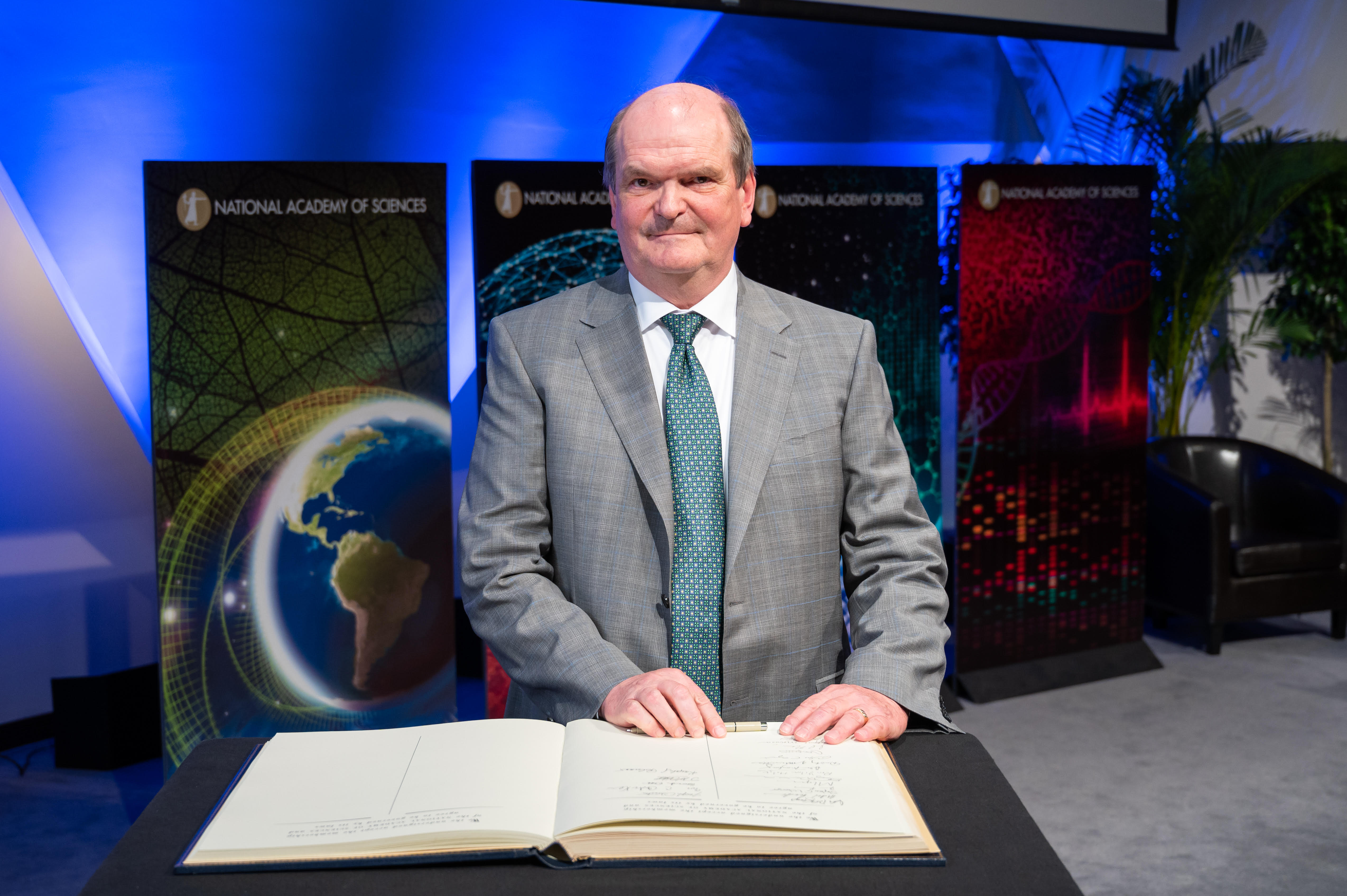
- Induction into the National Academy of Sciences
- Citizenship: United States
- Education: Technical University of Wroclaw (PhD in Biochemistry, 1986); University of Florida (Postdoctoral Fellowship, 1986-1988)
- Known for: phototransduction; the visual cycle; rhodopsin research
- Awards: Member, National Academy of Sciences (2022); Member, National Academy of Medicine (2019); Knight's Cross of the Order of Merit of the Republic of Poland (2011)
- Scientific career
- Fields: Biochemistry; Structural Biology; Pharmacology
- Workplaces: University of California, Irvine (2018-present); Case Western Reserve University (2005-2018); University of Washington (1992-2005)
- Doctoral advisor: Marian Kochman
- Other academic advisors: Paul Hargrave
- Website: ophthalmology.uci.edu/about/faculty/kpalczew

Krzysztof Palczewski, a member of the National Academy of Medicine and the National Academy of Sciences, is a Polish-born American biochemist and pharmacologist serving as a Donald Bren Professor and Distinguished Professor at the University of California, Irvine. He holds the Irving H. Leopold Chair of Ophthalmology and is the founding Director of the Brunson Center for Translational Vision Research at the Gavin Herbert Eye Institute.

== Biography ==
His master and doctoral degrees are from the University of Wrocław (1980) and the Wrocław University of Science and Technology (1986) respectively. In 1986, he joined Paul Hargrave's laboratory at that time leading the field in studies of rhodopsin at the University of Florida, thus launching a scientific career in the U.S. that brought him from the biochemistry and structural biology of the visual cycle components to drug discovery and novel treatments of eye diseases. He joined the faculty of the University of Washington (1992-2005), rising to the level of Professor in the departments of Ophthalmology, Pharmacology and Chemistry, including an appointment at the E.K. Bishop Professor in the Department of Ophthalmology. There, he published his most cited work to date, Crystal Structure of Rhodopsin: A G protein-coupled receptor. In 2005, he moved to Case Western Reserve University to lead the Department of Pharmacology and earned the title of Distinguished University Professor in 2016. He left in 2018 to take the position of Irving H. Leopold Chair of Ophthalmology at the University of California, Irvine in 2018. He is the founding Director of the Brunson Center for Translational Vision Research in UC Irvine's Gavin Herbert Eye Institute where he develops new classical and genome editing therapies against inherited retinal degenerations.

== Scientific contributions ==
He is best known for determining the crystal structure of rhodopsin, which led to new insights into the function of G protein-coupled receptors. His work on the visual cycle has led to both advances in understanding hereditary blindness and novel pharmacological treatments that can slow retinal degeneration. His work has shed light on juvenile- and age-related macular degeneration, suggesting approaches to novel therapeutics for these diseases. His team's efforts indicate that Two-photon imaging of the human eye can safely reveal the visual system's sub-cellular architecture and that humans can detect infrared light due to simultaneous two-photon absorption. The technical breakthroughs in noninvasive animal and human imaging have the potential to revolutionize the diagnosis and evaluation of patients with AMD, both in monitoring treatment efficacy and detecting early disease. Recent studies by his team have demonstrated both structural insights into rhodopsin modulation and mutation-agnostic treatment approaches for retinopathy. He and his collaborators applied a new generation of CRISPR technology called base editing and prime editing as a treatment for inherited retinal diseases. The implications of his research have the potential to lead to new treatments for many other inherited diseases.

== Selected honors and awards ==
- 1996 – Cogan Award, Association for Research in Vision and Ophthalmology
- 2011 – Knight's Cross of the Order of Merit of the Republic of Poland
- 2014 – Friedenwald Award from The Association for Research in Vision and Ophthalmology (ARVO)
- 2014 – Beckman-Argyros Award in Vision Research, Arnold and Mabel Beckman Foundation
- 2015 – Polish Academy of Arts and Sciences (foreign member)
- 2018 – Paul Kayser International Award for Retina Research from Retina Research Foundation
- 2019 – The National Academy of Medicine member
- 2021 – Donald Bren Professor, University of California, Irvine
- 2022 – The National Academy of Sciences member
- 2022 – The Goodman and Gilman Award in Receptor Pharmacology from the American Society for Pharmacology and Experimental Therapeutics
- 2023-2024 – The Distinguished Senior Faculty Award for Research, University of California, Irvine
