= Copernicus Award =

German-Polish science award

- Awarded for: the individuals most active in Polish-German scientific cooperation who have made exceptional research achievements as a result of that cooperation
- Country: Germany/Poland
- Presented by: Deutsche Forschungsgemeinschaft and Foundation for Polish Science
- Reward: €200,000
- First award: 2006
- Website: fnp.org.pl/en/component/fnp_programs/program/nicolaus-copernicus-polish-german-research-award

The Nicolaus Copernicus Polish-German Research Award (also known as Copernicus Award) is a biannual science award conferred by Deutsche Forschungsgemeinschaft and Foundation for Polish Science "to the individuals most active in Polish-German scientific cooperation who have made exceptional research achievements as a result of that cooperation." The award was established in 2006 and is named after Renaissance astronomer and polymath Nicolaus Copernicus (1473–1543). It carries a cash prize of €200,000 shared equally by two winners, one from Germany and one from Poland. In order to be eligible for the award, candidates must have at least a doctoral degree and work in Polish or German scientific institutions.

Permanent members of the Jury of the Copernicus Award include: Grażyna Jurkowlaniec (University of Warsaw) – chair of the Jury; Immo Fritsche (Leipzig University) – deputy chair of the Jury; Bernd Büchner (IFW Dresden); Paweł Idziak (Jagiellonian University); Maria Mittag (University of Jena); Marek Samoć (Wrocław University of Technology).

== Copernicus Award winners ==
| Year | Name | Institution | Field |
|---|---|---|---|
| 2026 | Dorothee Haroske | University of Jena | Mathematical analysis |
| 2026 | Leszek Skrzypczak | Adam Mickiewicz University in Poznań | Mathematical analysis |
| 2024 | Joachim Wambsganss | University of Heidelberg | Exoplanets |
| 2024 | Andrzej Udalski | University of Warsaw | Exoplanets |
| 2022 | Sascha Feuchert | University of Giessen | Holocaust studies |
| 2022 | Krystyna Radziszewska | University of Łódź | Holocaust studies |
| 2020 | Stefan Dziembowski | University of Warsaw | Theoretical cryptography and information security |
| 2020 | Sebastian Faust | Technische Universität Darmstadt | Theoretical cryptography and information security |
| 2018 | Stefan Anker | Charité – Universitätsmedizin Berlin | Pathophysiology of heart failure |
| 2018 | Piotr Ponikowski | Wrocław Medical University | Pathophysiology of heart failure |
| 2016 | Agnieszka Chacińska | University of Warsaw | Molecular cell biology |
| 2016 | Peter Rehling | University of Göttingen | Molecular cell biology |
| 2014 | Marek Żukowski | University of Gdańsk | Quantum optics |
| 2014 | Harald Weinfurter | TU Wien | Quantum optics |
| 2012 | Jacek Błażewicz | Poznań University of Technology | Business information systems |
| 2012 | Erwin Pesch | University of Siegen | Business information systems |
| 2010 | Alfred Forchel | University of Würzburg | Solid-state physics and the physics of nanostructures |
| 2010 | Jan Misiewicz | Wrocław University of Technology | Solid-state physics and the physics of nanostructures |
| 2008 | Andrzej Sobolewski | Polish Academy of Sciences | Photochemistry and photophysics of biomolecules |
| 2008 | Wolfgang Domcke | Technical University of Munich | Photochemistry and photophysics of biomolecules |
| 2006 | Barbara Malinowska | University of Warsaw | Pharmacology and physiology |
| 2006 | Eberhard Schlicker | University of Bonn | Pharmacology and physiology |

== See also ==
- List of general science and technology awards
- Prize of the Foundation for Polish Science
- Polish-German relations
- Brückepreis
