= Foundation for Polish Science =

Polish nonprofit organization that promotes research

- Fundacja na rzecz Nauki Polskiej
- Formation: December 21, 1990; 35 years ago
- Headquarters: Warsaw, Poland
- Leader: Maciej Żylicz
- Website: fnp.org.pl

The Foundation For Polish Science (Polish: Fundacja na rzecz Nauki Polskiej, FNP) is an independent, non-profit organisation which aims to improve research opportunities in Poland, and to provide assistance and support to the scientific community there. It was established in 1990 and registered in 1991. The FNP supports research groups as well as individual scientists by awarding grants, and scholarships, and prizes such as the Prize of the Foundation for Polish Science. The FNP's efforts are widely regarded as crucial in transforming Polish science after 1989.

== Programs ==
The FNP offers scholarships and grants for outstanding researchers in various career stages, regardless of citizenship. These programs include the following:

- The Prize of the Foundation, also known as The Polish Nobel Prize – the most important scientific prize in Poland, which is awarded in four fields: Life sciences, Chemistry and material science, Mathematics, physics and engineering, as well as humanities and social sciences. Each recipient gets 200,000 zł (about $65,000).
- The Polish-American Scientific Award – a common undertaking between the Foundation for Polish Science and the American Association for the Advancement of Science.
- The Polish-German scientific award Copernicus - offered jointly by FNP and Deutsche Forschungsgemeinschaft.
- Mistrz
- Homing Plus - a program designed to encourage Polish scientists who have emigrated to return home.
- Stypendia START

== Architecture ==
The new FNP Headquarters are located in Wierzbno, Warsaw. The building survived World War II. The building has recently been renovated and the facade is now covered in greenery. The living wall is the first in Poland and apart from the environmental benefits it helps blend the building with the green surroundings.

== See also ==
- Timeline of Polish science and technology
- Polish Children's Fund
- The National Science Centre
