= List of Turkish philosophers and scientists =

Notable Turkish philosophers, scientists and scholars include:

== A ==
- Ahmet Yesevi, mystic and philosopher
- Ahmet Resmi, historian
- Ahi Çelebi, physician
- Silahdar Fındıklılı Mehmed Ağa, historian
- Ali Akansu, electrical engineer
- Zeynep Akata, scientist
- İsmail Akbay, engineer
- Selman Akbulut, mathematician
- Cezmi Akdis, medical researcher in the field of immunology. He is director of the Swiss Institute of Allergy and Asthma Research
- Akshamsaddin, scholar, poet, mystic, and scientist
- Abdülkadir Topkaç, astronomer
- Alev Alatlı, economist
- Mustafa Âlî, historian
- Ahmet Alkan, economist
- Cahit Arf, mathematician
- Yılmaz Argüden, is a Turkish strategist, governance expert and economist
- Erdal Arikan, electrical engineer
- Oruç Aruoba, poet, philosopher
- Huseyin Arslan, engineer
- Mete Atatüre, physicist
- Aşıkpaşazade, historian
- 'Abd al-Hamīd ibn Turk, mathematician
- Alper Gezeravcı, pilot and astronaut
- Ahi Evran, mystic

== B ==
- Aykut Barka, earth scientist
- Asım Orhan Barut, physicist
- Turhan Baytop, botanist
- Fatih Birol, economist and energy expert
- Hulusi Behçet, dermatologist, physician and scientist
- Besim Ömer Akalın, physician
- Orkut Büyükkökten, software engineer

== C ==
- Tantek Çelik, computer scientist
- Erhan Çınlar, probabilist
- Cahit Arf, mathematician

== D ==
- Hilmi Volkan Demir, scientist
- Asli Demirguc-Kunt, economist
- Arda Denkel, philosopher
- Naşide Gözde Durmuş, geneticist

== E ==
- Ahmed Resmî Efendi, historian and diplomat
- Gelenbevi İsmail Efendi, mathematician
- Hoca Sadeddin Efendi, historian
- Yunus Emre, poet, mystic and philosopher
- Osman Nuri Eralp, veterinary scientist and microbiologist
- Ali Erdemir, scientist
- Sabri Ergun, chemical engineer. He is known for the Ergun equation
- Elza Erkip, electrical and computer engineer
- Ayşe Erzan, theoretical physicist
- İbrahim Hakkı Erzurumi, philosopher and mystic

== F ==
- Molla Şemseddin Fenari, logician, Islamic theologian
- Nusret Fişek, physician
- Farabi, philosopher and music theorist

== G ==
- Erol Gelenbe, computer scientist
- Feza Gürsey, mathematician and physicist
- Metin Gürses, founded The Science Academy Society of Turkey
- Nüzhet Gökdoğan, astronomer and mathematician
- Fatin Gökmen, astronomer

== H ==
- Osman Hamdi Bey, archaeologist
- Hezârfen Ahmed Çelebi, polymath
- Halil İnalcık, historian

== I ==
- Fatih Ömer İlday, physicist
- Ataç İmamoğlu, physicist
- Umran Inan, scientist
- Erdal İnönü, physicist, politician
- Ahmet Mete Işıkara, seismologist
- İlber Ortaylı, historian
- İlter Turan, was the president of International Political Science Association

== K ==
- Nami Kartal, wood scientist
- İhsan Ketin, geologist
- Osman Kibar, engineer and founder of Biosplice
- Ioanna Kuçuradi, Professor of Philosophy, President of Turkish Philosophy Association
- Behram Kurşunoğlu, physicist
- Yalçın Küçük, economist, historian and sovietologist
- Çetin Kaya Koç, engineer
- C. Emre Koksal, electrical and computer engineer
- Kâtip Çelebi, polymath and author
- Mahmud Kashgari, scholar and lexicographer

== L ==
- Lagâri Hasan Çelebi, scientist, engineer and aviator

== M ==
- Mirim Çelebi, astronomer
- Janet Akyüz Mattei, astronomer
- Frederick Akbar Mahomed, his Turkish father was Dean Mahomed Frederick was an internationally known British physician
- Müneccimbaşı Ahmed Dede, astronomer, astrologer and historian
- Takiyettin Mengişoğlu, philosopher
- Molla Fenari, logician, theologian, scholar, and philosopher

== N ==
- Mustafa Naima, historian
- Matrakçı Nasuh, mathematician, historian, geographer, cartographer, swordmaster, and miniaturist
- Leyla Neyzi, anthropologist, sociologist and historian

== O ==
- Hakkı Ögelman, physicist and astrophysicist
- Mehmet Öz, surgeon and author
- Feryal Özel, astrophysicist
- Hasan Özbekhan, scientist, cyberneticist, philosopher and planner who was professor emeritus
- Aslı Özyürek, linguist, cognitive scientist and psychologist

== P ==
- Burçin Mutlu-Pakdil, astrophysicist
- Şevket Pamuk, economics and economic History
- Ahmet Cevdet Pasha, sociologist, legist and historian
- İbrahim Peçevi, historian
- Kadrî of Pergamon, linguist

== Q ==
- Ali Qushji, astronomer, mathematician, physicist and scientist
- Yusif Qarabaghi, scientist, doctor, and philosopher

== R ==
- Piri Reis, cartographer and admiral
- Kemal Reis, cartographer
- Bursalı Kadızade Rumi, mathematician
- Seydi Ali Reis, cartographer

== S ==
- Gülsün Sağlamer, architect
- Aziz Sancar, biochemist
- Aydın Sayılı, historian of science
- Hu Sihui, he was the first to empirically discover and clearly describe deficiency diseases.
- Mustafa Selaniki, historian
- Muzafer Sherif, social psychologist
- Oktay Sinanoğlu, theoretical chemist and molecular biologist
- Uğur Şahin, cancer research, immunology, CEO of BioNTech
- Celâl Şengör, geologist
- Sabuncuoğlu Şerafeddin, physician
- İbrahim Adnan Saraçoğlu, chemistry, biochemist, microbiologist and researcher.

== T ==
- Takiyüddin, Ottoman polymath, astronomer
- Semih Tezcan, civil engineer
- Hüseyin Tevfik Pasha, mathematician
- Mehmet Toner, cryobiologist, biomedical engineer
- Özlem Türeci, physician, scientist and entrepreneur; co-founded the biotechnology company BioNTech
- ibn Turk, ninth-century mathematician

== U ==
- Turgay Üzer, physicist
- Ulugh Beg, astronomer and mathematician
- Ulus Baker, sociologist

== V ==
- Vamık Volkan, psychiatrist and author

== Y ==
- Nur Yalman, anthropologist
- Gazi Yaşargil, father of modern microneurosurgery
- Muhammed Hamdi Yazır, theologian
- Cem Yıldırım, mathematician
- Cemal Yıldırım, philosopher of science
- Yusuf Has Hacip, political scientist, astronomer, author
