= Nami (name) =

Nami is both a given name and surname.

== Given name ==
=== Japanese ===
Nami (なみ, ナミ, 奈美, 成実, 菜美) is a Japanese feminine given name. People with this name include:

- Nami Akimoto (秋元 奈美; born 1968), Japanese manga artist
- Nami Asada (麻田奈美, born 1953–54) ia gravure model who was active in Japan in the 1970s
- Nami Hayakawa早川 浪 (born 1984), Japanese athlete
- Nami Iguchi (井口 奈己; born 1967), Japanese film director, screenwriter and editor
- Nami Inamori (稲森 奈見; born 1993), Japanese judoka
- Nami Kurokawa (黒河 奈美; born 1980), Japanese voice actress and singer
- Nami Matsuda (松田 ナミ; 1904–1995), Christian Japanese female physician
- Nami Matsukawa (松川 ナミ; born 1961), Japanese 1980s pink film actress and bondage and fetish model
- Nami Matsuyama (松山 奈未; born 1998), Japanese badminton player
- Nami Miyahara (宮原 永海; born 1978), Japanese voice actress and singer
- Nami Miyazaki (宮崎 奈美; born 1976), Japanese field hockey international goalkeeper
- Nami Nabekura (鍋倉 那美; born 1997), Japanese judoka
- Nami Nemoto (根本 奈美; born 1975), Japanese speed skater
- Nami Otake (大竹 七未; born 1974), Japanese former football player
- Nami Sano (佐野 菜見; 1987–2023), Japanese manga artist
- Nami Tamaki (玉置 成実; born 1988), Japanese singer
- Nami Teshima (手島 奈美; born 1974), Japanese judo wrestler
- Nami Tsukamoto (柄本 奈美; born 1979), Japanese ballet dancer and film actress
- Nami Urabe (born 1978), Japanese former professional tennis player

=== Other origins ===
It is also a given name of various other origins. People with the given name unrelated to the Japanese version include:

- Na-mi (born 1957), South Korean singer
- Nami Kartal (born 1969), Turkish wood scientist and professor
- Nami Melumad (born 1988), Israeli-Dutch film and television composer, conductor, flautist, and pianist
- Nami Mun (born 1968), Korean American novelist and short story writer
- Nami Yayak, Turkish Olympic fencer, competed in 1928
- Naminapu "Nami" Maymuru-White (born 1952), Australian artist of the Yolngu people

== Surname ==
People with the surname Nami include:

- Ahmad Nami (1873–1962), second president of Syria
- Ahmed al-Nami (1977–2001), Saudi hijacker of United Airlines Flight 93 in 2001
- Arsi Nami (born 1984), Iranian singer
- Elham Nami (born 1986) Iranian actress
- Glen Nami, Papua New Guinean rugby league coach and former player
- Kazutsugi Nami (born 1933), Japanese businessman
- Mahfoozur Rahman Nami (1911–1963) Indian Muslim scholar, politician and an author
- Mohammad Nami, Saudi footballer
- Mohammad-Hassan Nami (born 1953), Iranian military officer
- Muhammad Mamman Nami (born 1968), Nigerian accountant, management professional, tax administrator and public officer
- Özdil Nami (born 1967) British-born Turkish Cypriot politician

== Fictional characters ==
- Nami (One Piece), one of the protagonists in the manga series One Piece
- Nami, a character and bachelorette in the video games Harvest Moon: A Wonderful Life and Harvest Moon DS
- Nami Aoi, a character from the manga series Aki Sora
- Nami Hito, a character in the manga series Sayonara, Zetsubou-Sensei
- Nami Kuki, a character in the manga series Jungle De Ikou!
- Nami Kusunoki, a character in the manga series Alive: The Final Evolution
- Nami Satō, a character from the visual novel Gift

== See also ==
- Nami (disambiguation)
