= Oruç =

Oruç is a Turkish given name and a surname. Notable people with the name include:

== Given name ==
- Oruç Aruoba (1948–2020), Turkish writer, poet, and philosopher
- Oruç Bey (Oruç bin Âdil), 15th-century Ottoman historian
- Oruç Güvenç (1948-2017), Turkish Sufi master, musician, music therapist, ethnomusicologist and a poet.
- Oruç Reis (1470s-1518), Ottoman corsair, Sultan of Algiers

== Surname ==
- Sinem Oruç (born 2007), Turkish female judoka
