= Marek Sanak =

Polish geneticist and molecular biologist (born 1958)

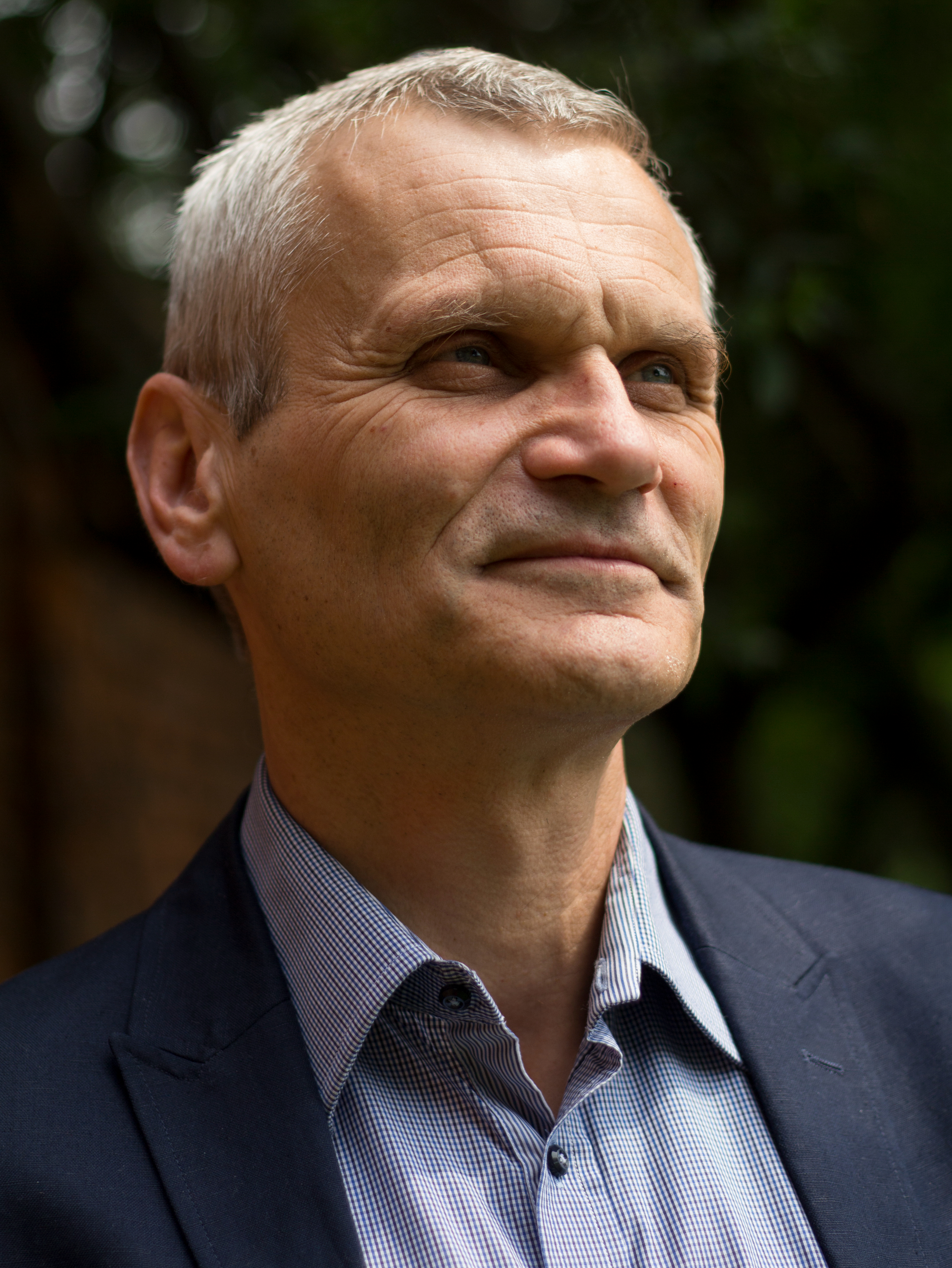
- Marek Sanak, 2015
- Born: 24 November 1958 (age 67); Kraków
- Citizenship: Polish
- Education: Medical Academy in Kraków
- Occupations: geneticist molecular biologist

Marek Jan Sanak (born 24 November 1958) is a Polish geneticist and molecular biologist, professor of medical sciences, Head of the Department of Molecular Biology and Clinical Genetics of the Jagiellonian University Medical College, Head of the Department of Biochemical and Molecular Diagnostics at the University Hospital in Kraków, the Jagiellonian University Rector's Plenipotentiary for Science and Development in the Medical College, member of the Polish Academy of Sciences, Polish Academy of Learning and Academia Europaea, the author of more than 230 original research papers published in peer reviewed journals. In 1997, together with Andrzej Szczeklik, he received the Lancet Investigators Award of The Lancet magazine for their research on bronchial asthma.

== Biography ==
He was born in 1958, the son of Maria Sanak (née Policht), later a judge of the Supreme Administrative Court of Poland, and Stanisław Sanak. He attended the Bartłomiej Nowodworski High School, where he passed matura in 1977.

In 1983, he graduated with distinction from the Medical Academy in Kraków. That year, he started to work as a junior assistant at the Department of Medical Genetics at the Pediatrics Institute in Kraków. In 1988, he took a three-month internship at Harvard University. In 1991, he received a one-year scholarship from the Ministry of Scientific Research and Technology of the Republic of France, in the unit U-12 of the Institute of Medical Research (INSERM), located in the Necker Hospital in Paris and headed by Arnold Munnich and Marie-Claude Hors-Cayla.

In 1989, he received the second degree of specialization in pediatrics with distinction. In the following years, he worked as a pediatrician.

In 1993, he obtained a Ph.D. at the Jagiellonian University, under the supervision of Jacek J. Pietrzyk. His doctoral thesis focused on the congenital disorders in children, taking into account the distribution of atmospheric pollution with heavy metals. Between 1993 and 2005 he worked as an assistant professor at the Institute of Pharmacology of the Polish Academy of Sciences, at the Department of Brain Biochemistry headed by Jerzy Vetulani.

Since 1995, he also worked at the Jagiellonian University Medical College (CMUJ), at the Department of Allergy and Immunology and as Head of the Laboratory of Molecular Biology, Department of Internal Diseases, running research mostly in the fields of genetics and molecular biology.

In 1997, he spent two months in the Swiss Institute of Allergy and Asthma Research in Davos. In 1998, he re-visited Harvard, making a two-month stay. He obtained the postdoctoral degree in medical sciences in the field of clinical genetics in 2001. In 2005, he obtained a specialization in clinical genetics, and in 2007 – a specialization in laboratory medical genetics.

In 2007, he received the title of professor of medical sciences. Since 2008, he has been Head of the Department of Biochemical and Molecular Diagnostics at the University Hospital in Kraków, and since 2009 Head of the Department of Molecular Biology and Clinical Genetics of the Medical Faculty of the Jagiellonian University Medical College. He was appointed the Jagiellonian University Rector's Plenipotentiary for Science and Development in the Medical College for the term 2016–2020.

Sanak authored or co-authored more than 230 original research papers in international peer reviewed journals.

He was the author of the discovery of the genetic polymorphism of the promoter region of the gene of the leukotriene C4 synthase; and he participated in establishing the relationship between genetic overexpression caused by the presence of the altered allele of that gene and the overproduction of cysteinyl leukotrienes in bronchial asthma. For this last discovery, in 1997 he received the Lancet Investigators Award of The Lancet magazine, together with Andrzej Szczeklik.

Sanak has been active as an academic teacher. Since 2003, he has been a lecturer at the Postgraduate Studies of the Faculty of Pharmacy at the Jagiellonian University. Since 2005, he has been leading a course for the students of the Faculty of Biotechnology of the Jagiellonian University. Since 2006, he has been leading the classes for the students of the Faculty of Medicine and the School of Medicine in English of the Jagiellonian University. He was the promoter of fourteen doctoral dissertations.

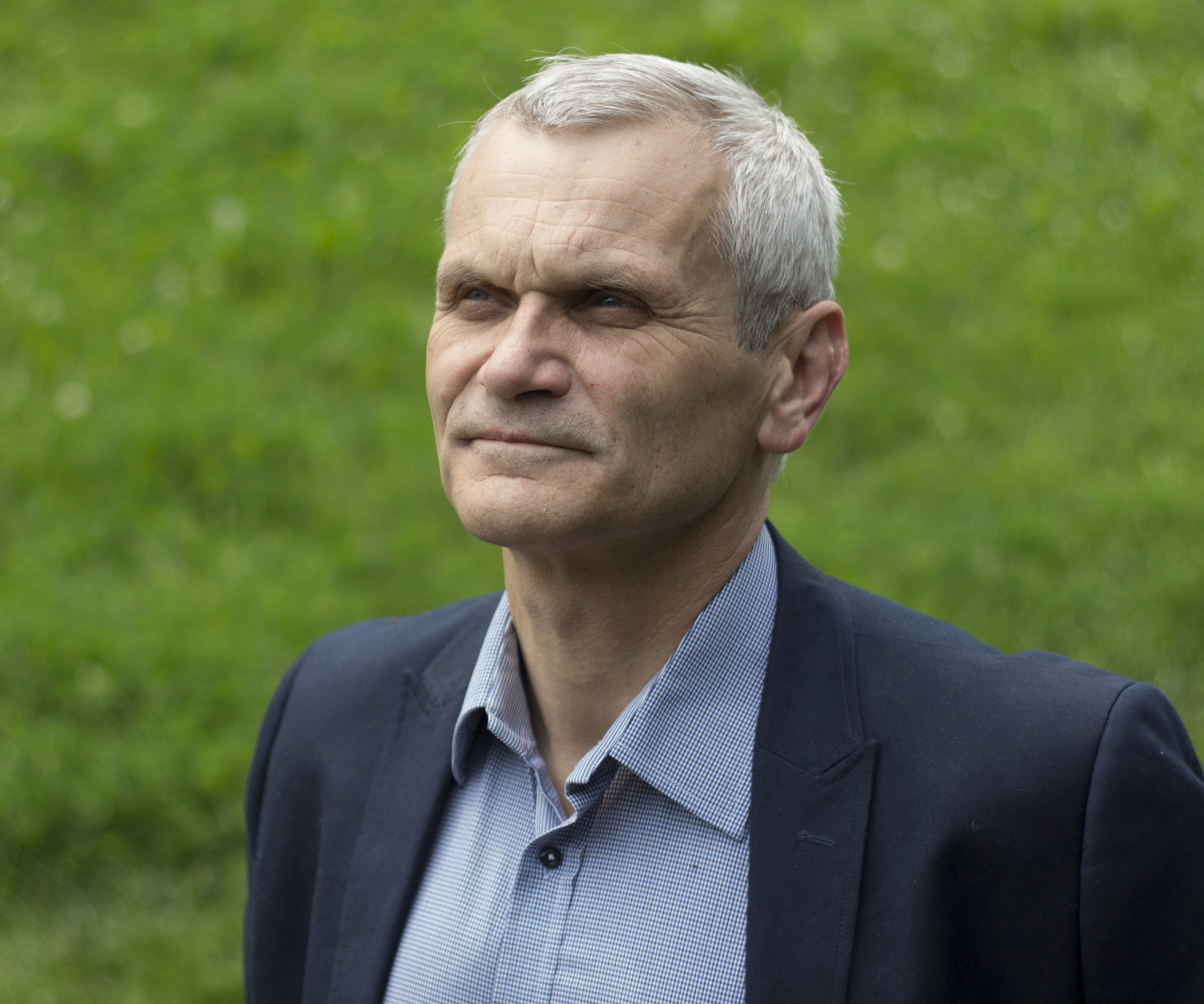
Marek Sanak (2015)

He is a member of the Polish Society of Paediatrics (since 1986), the Polish Society of Human Genetics (since 1997) and the European Society for Paediatric Research (since 1990). He is also a member of the European Society for Clinical Investigation and was its vice-president between 2003 and 2004.

Since 2003, he has been a member of the Scientific Council of the Institute of Pharmacology of the Polish Academy of Sciences. In 2006, he was elected a member of the Scientific Council of the School of Medicine in English of the Jagiellonian University. Since 2007, he has been a member of the Interdisciplinary Center of Bioethics of the Jagiellonian University Medical College, as well as member of the Committee of Physiological and Pharmacological Sciences of the Polish Academy of Sciences.

He is a member of the editorial boards of journals Allergy and Medycyna Praktyczna; as well as the board of the popular science magazine Wszechświat. He is a member of the Program Council of the Science and Art Festival in Kraków (Festiwal Nauki i Sztuki).

In 2008, he was elected a member of the Polish Academy of Learning. In December 2021 he was elected a corresponding member of the Polish Academy of Sciences. In 2023 he was elected a member of the Academia Europaea.

== Personal life ==
He is married to Iwona Sanak, a voivodeship consultant in the field of pediatric dentistry. Their daughter, Katarzyna Sanak-Kosmowska, is a marketing theorist.

== Awards ==
- Lancet Investigators Award (1997)
- Individual Award of the Minister of Health and Welfare of Poland for the outstanding achievements in the field of molecular biology (1999)
- Jagiellonian University Rector Award (2010)
- Jagiellonian Laurel (2012)
- Distinction for the best lecturer awarded by the students of the School of Medicine in English of the Jagiellonian University Medical College (2013)
- „Pro Arte Docendi” Award (2014)
