= Urooj =

- Pronunciation: UR-rooj
- Gender: Feminine & Masculine

Origin
- Origin: Persian, Turkish
- Meaning: "Rising, mounting"

Other names
- Alternative spelling: Arooj, Aroj, Aruj, Orooj
- Variant form: Oruç (Turkish)

Urooj (Persian: عروج) is a Persian and Turkish unisex name meaning "rising, mounting, exaltation, ascension".

== Other language variants ==
- Arrudye (Spanish)

== People ==
=== Given name ===
- Aroj Ali Matubbar (1900–1985), Bangladeshi philosopher, humanist and rationalist
- Arooj Aftab (born 1985), Pakistani singer
- Arooj Shah (born 1978), British politician
- Oruç Aruoba (1948–2020), Turkish writer, poet, and philosopher
- Oruç Bey, Ottoman historian
- Oruç Güvenç (1948–2017), Turkish Sufi master
- Oruç Reis (1474–1518), a Barbary pirate
- Urooj Arshad (born 1975), American activist
- Urooj Ashfaq (born 1995), Indian comedian, writer, and actor
- Urooj Mumtaz (born 1985), Pakistani cricket commentator and former cricketer
