= Science and technology in the Ottoman Empire =

During its 600-year existence, the Ottoman Empire made significant advances in science and technology, in a wide range of fields including mathematics, astronomy and medicine.

The Islamic Golden Age was traditionally believed to have ended in the thirteenth century, but has been extended to the fifteenth and sixteenth centuries by some, who have included continuing scientific activity in the Ottoman Empire in the west and in Persia and Mughal India in the east.

== Education ==
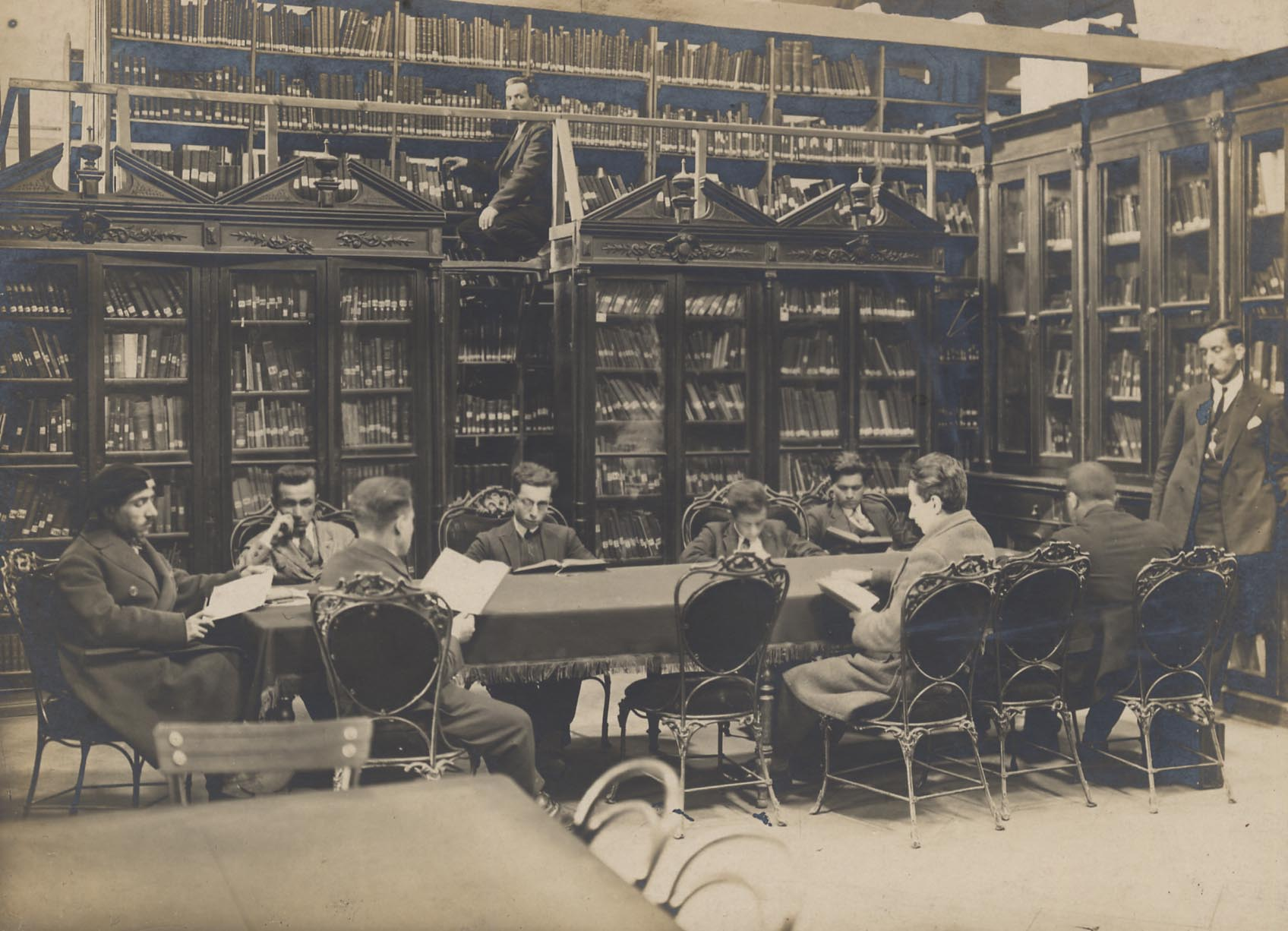
Beyazıt State Library was founded in 1884.

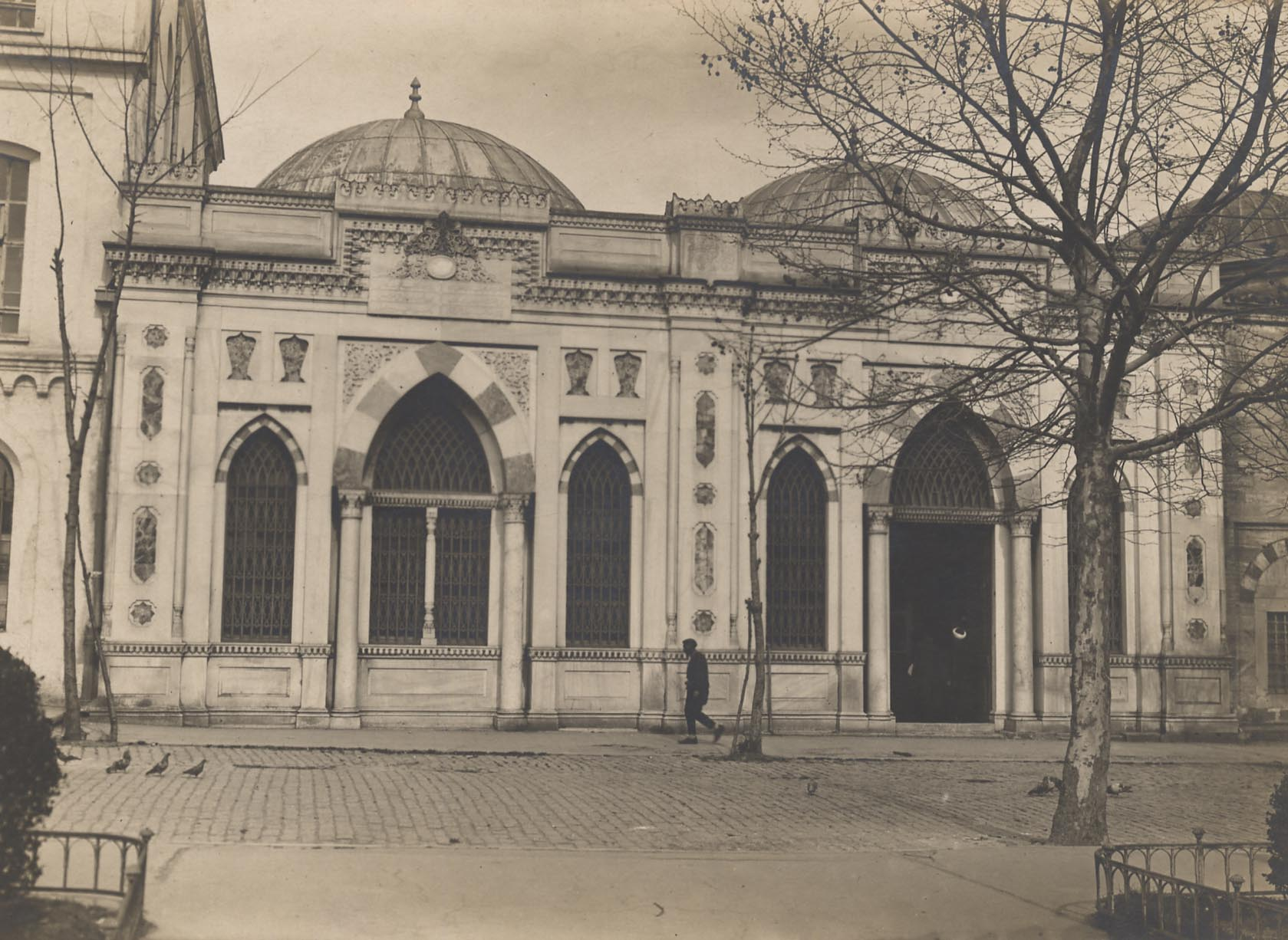
Beyazıt State Library was founded in 1884.

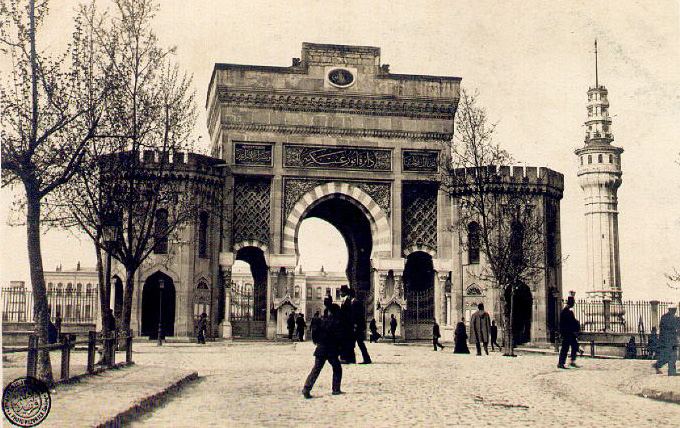
Istanbul University is the oldest university in Turkey

=== Advancement of madrasah ===
The madrasah education institution, which first originated during the Seljuk period, reached its highest point during the Ottoman reign.

=== Education of Ottoman Women in Medicine ===
Harems were places within a Sultan's palace where his wives, daughters, and female slaves were expected to stay. However, accounts of teaching young girls and boys here have been recorded. Most education of women in the Ottoman Empire was focused on teaching the women to be good house wives and social etiquette. Although the formal education of women was not popular, female physicians and surgeons were still accounted for. Female physicians were given an informal education instead of a formal one. However, the first properly trained female Turkish physician was Safiye Ali. Ali studied medicine in Germany and opened her own practice in Istanbul in 1922, 1 year before the fall of the Ottoman Empire.

=== Technical education ===
Istanbul Technical University has a history that began in 1773. It was founded by Sultan Mustafa III as the Imperial Naval Engineers' School (original name: Mühendishane-i Bahr-i Humayun), and it was originally dedicated to the training of ship builders and cartographers. In 1795 the scope of the school was broadened to train technical military staff to modernize the Ottoman army to match the European standards. In 1845 the engineering department of the school was further developed with the addition of a program devoted to the training of architects. The scope and name of the school were extended and changed again in 1883 and in 1909 the school became a public engineering school which was aimed at training civil engineers who could create new infrastructure to develop the empire.

== Astronomy ==
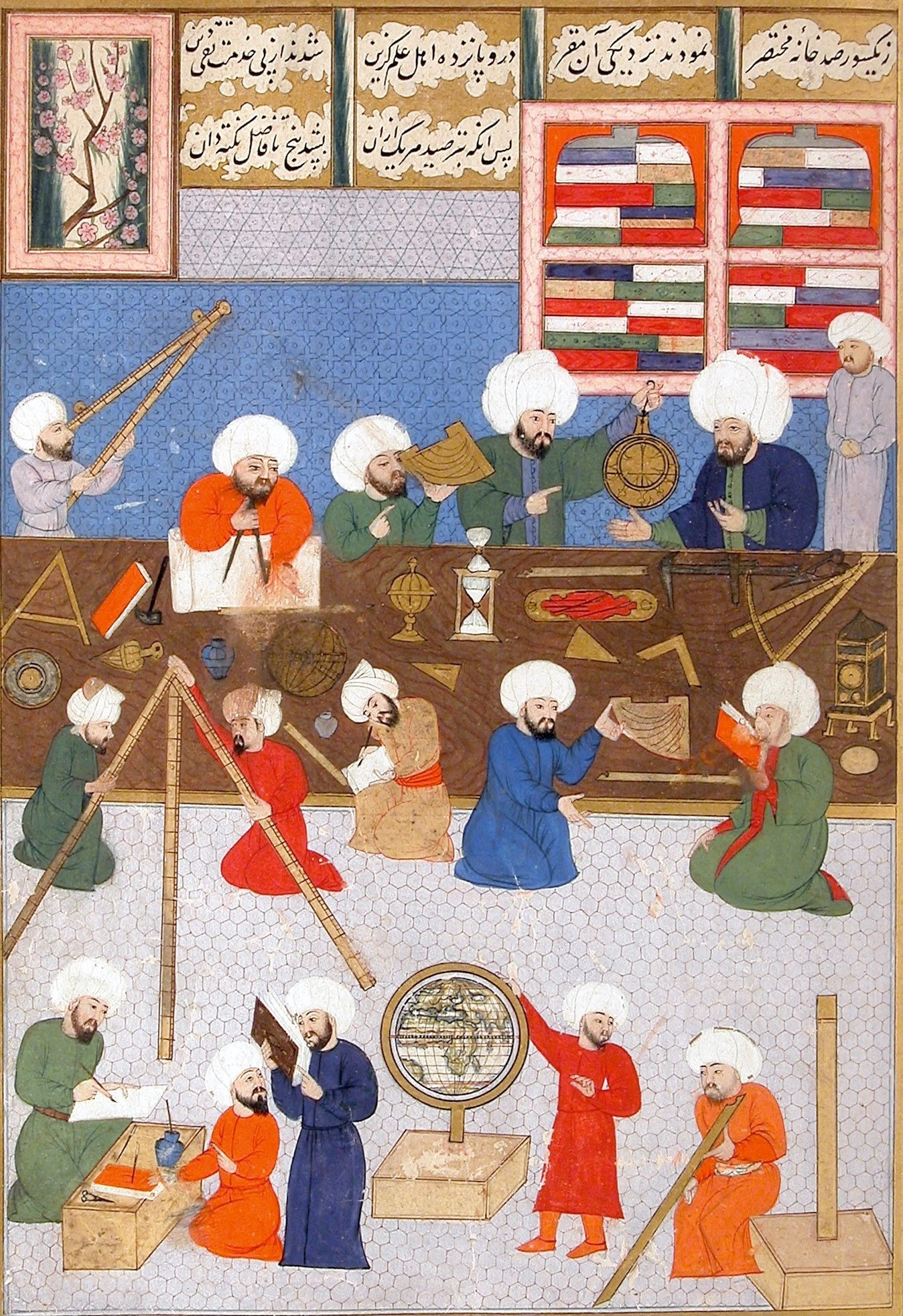
Work in the observatorium of Taqi al-Din.

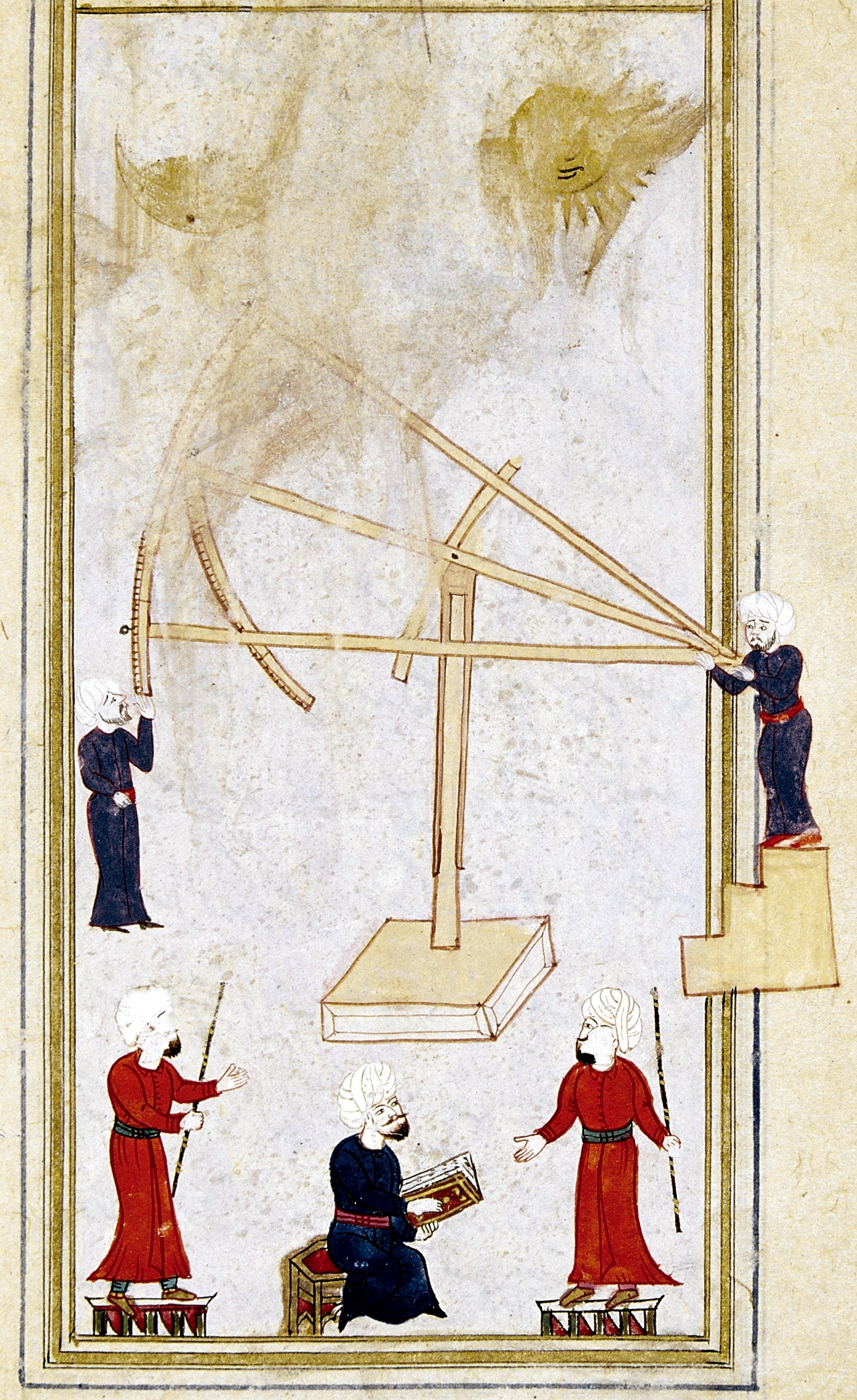
Ottoman observatory astronomers and astrologers headed by the müneccimbaşı (chief astrologer) using the sextant.

Astronomy was a very important discipline in the Ottoman Empire.

Taqi al-Din later built the Constantinople Observatory of Taqi ad-Din in 1577, where he carried out astronomical observations until 1580. He produced a Zij (named Unbored Pearl) and astronomical catalogues that were more accurate than those of his contemporaries, Tycho Brahe and Nicolaus Copernicus. Taqi al-Din was also the first astronomer to employ a decimal point notation in his observations rather than the sexagesimal fractions used by his contemporaries and predecessors. He also made use of Abū Rayhān al-Bīrūnī's method of "three points observation". In The Nabk Tree, Taqi al-Din described the three points as "two of them being in opposition in the ecliptic and the third in any desired place." He used this method to calculate the eccentricity of the Sun's orbit and the annual motion of the apogee, and so did Copernicus before him, and Tycho Brahe shortly afterwards. He also invented a variety of other astronomical instruments, including accurate mechanical astronomical clocks from 1556 to 1580. Due to his observational clock and other more accurate instruments Taqi al-Din's values were more accurate.

After the destruction of the Constantinople observatory of Taqi al-Din in 1580, astronomical activity stagnated in the Ottoman Empire, until the introduction of Copernican heliocentrism in 1660, when the Ottoman scholar Ibrahim Efendi al-Zigetvari Tezkireci translated Noël Duret's French astronomical work (written in 1637) into Arabic. Unlike the theological debates and problems it brought the Christian-European world, the Ottomans were mostly indifferent and accepting to Heliocentrism, seeing it more as a tool to calculate planetary motions then a theological threat to the Quran and Sunnah.

== Geography ==
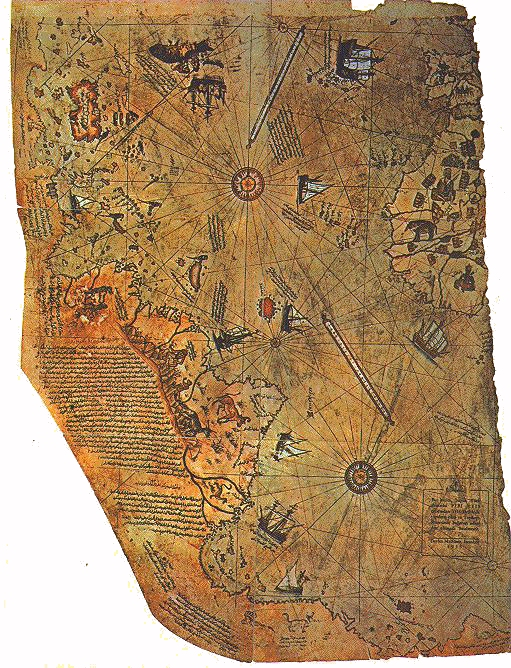
The Piri Reis map.

Ottoman admiral Piri Reis (Turkish: Pîrî Reis or Hacı Ahmet Muhittin Pîrî Bey) was a navigator, geographer and cartographer active in the early 1500s. He is known today for his maps and charts collected in his Kitab-ı Bahriye (Book of Navigation), and for the Piri Reis map, one of the oldest maps of America still in existence.

His book contains detailed information on navigation, as well as accurate charts (for their time) describing the important ports and cities of the Mediterranean Sea. His world map, drawn in 1513, is the oldest known Turkish atlas showing the New World. The map was rediscovered by German theologian Gustav Adolf Deissmann in 1929 in the course of work cataloging items held by the Topkapı Palace library.

== Medicine ==
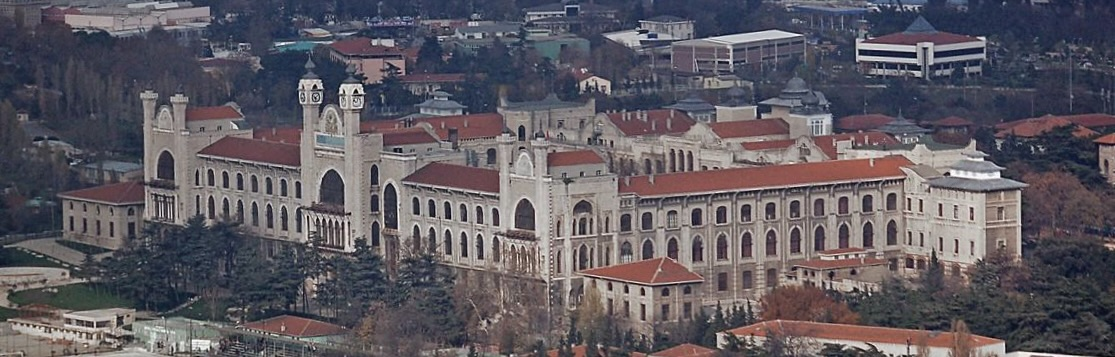
Haydarpaşa campus of Marmara University, originally the Imperial College of Medicine (Mekteb-i Tıbbiye-i Şahane), Istanbul.

Medicine in the Ottoman Empire was practiced in nearly all places of society as physicians treated patients in homes, markets, and hospitals. Treatment at these different locations were generally the same, but different modalities of treatment existed throughout the Ottoman Empire. Different methodologies included humoral principles, curative medicine, preventative medicine, and prophetic medicine. Ottoman hospitals also adopted the concept of integralism in which a holistic approach to treatment was used. Considerations of this approach included quality of life and care and treatment of both physical and mental health. The integralistic approach shaped the structure of the Ottoman hospital as each sector and group of workers was dedicated to treating a different aspect of the patient's well-being. All shared the general consensus of treating patients with kindness and gentility, but physicians treated the physical body, and musicians used music therapy to treat the mind. Music was regarded as a powerful healing tune and that different sounds had the ability to create different mental states of health.

One of the original building blocks of early Ottoman medicine was humoralism, and the concept of illness to be a result of disequilibrium among the four humors of the body. The four physiological humors each related to one of the four elements: blood and air, phlegm and water, black bile and earth, yellow bile and fire.

Medicinal treatments in early Ottoman medicine often include the use of foods and beverages. Coffee, taken both medicinally and recreationally, was used to treat stomach problems and indigestion by working as a laxative. The stimulant properties of coffee eventually gained recognition and coffee was used to curb fatigue and exhaustion. The use of coffee in medicinal senses was done more in practice by civilians than hospital professionals.

Hospitals and related health-care institutions were referred to as a variety of names: dârüşşifâ, dârüssıhhâ, şifâhâne, bîmaristân, bîmarhâne, and timarhâne. Hospitals were vakif institutions, dedicated to charity and offering care to people of all social classes. The aesthetic aspects of the hospitals, including gardens and architecture, were said to be "healing by design". The hospitals also included hammams, or bathhouses, to treat the patients' humors.

The first Ottoman hospital established was the Faith Complex dârüşşifâ in 1470; it closed in 1824. Unique features of the hospital were the separation of patients by sex and the use of music to treat the mentally ill. The Bâyezîd Dârüşşifâ was founded in 1488 and is most recognized for its unique architecture that served as an influence in the architecture of later European hospitals. The hospital built by Ayşe Hafsa Sulta in 1522 is recognized as one of the most esteemed hospitals of the Ottoman Empire. The hospital devoted a separate wing for the mentally ill, until later limiting all treatment to only the mentally ill. The bîmârîstân's medrese provided medical students with combined theoretical and clinical coursework through hospital internships.

Notable Ottoman medical literature includes the work of the Jewish doctor Mûsâ b. Hamun who wrote one of the first literature primarily about dentistry. Hamun also wrote Risâle fî Tabâyi’l-Edviye ve İsti’mâlihâ, which used a combination of Hebrew, Arabic, Greek, and European works to transfer European knowledge of medicine to the Ottoman realm. The writer Ibn Cânî, after noticing the prevalence of tobacco use in Turkey, translated Spanish and Arabic works discussing the use of tobacco leaf in medical treatment. The physician Ömer b. Sinan el-İznikî’s works follow the theme of the Chemical Medicine movement and in his two books, Kitâb-I Künûz-I Hayâti’l-İnsân and Kanûn-I Etibbâ-yi Feylosofân, enclosing directions for the production of medicines. One of the key contributors to Ottoman medical education was Şânizâde Mehmed Atâullah Efendi, whose Hamse-I Şânizâde presented modern European anatomy to Ottoman medicine. In 1873, Cemaleddin Efendi and a group of students from the Imperial Medical School put out the Lügat-I Tıbbiye, the first modern medical dictionary written in Turkish. Şerafeddin Sabuncuoğlu was the author of the Cerrahiyyetu'l-Haniyye (Imperial Surgery), the first illustrated surgical atlas, and the Mücerrebname (On Attemption). The Cerrahiyyetu'l-Haniyye (Imperial Surgery) was the first surgical atlas and the last major medical encyclopedia from the Islamic world. Though his work was largely based on Abu al-Qasim al-Zahrawi's Al-Tasrif, Sabuncuoğlu introduced many innovations of his own. Female surgeons were also illustrated for the first time in the Cerrahiyyetu'l-Haniyye.

The first modern medical school of the Ottoman Empire was the Naval Medical School, or Tersâne Tıbbiyesi, established in January 1806. The education of the school was largely European-based, using texts in Italian or French and medical journals published in Europe. Behçet Efendi founded the Imperial Medical School, Tıbhâne-I Âmire, of Istanbul in 1827 which was based on the following structural guidelines: the acceptance only of Muslim students, and the teachings would be almost entirely in French. In 1839, after Tanzimat reforms, the school was opened to non-Muslim individuals as well. After this point, non-Muslim students became the majority of graduating class and were better able to adapt and take advantage of the European-based education as many of them already spoke French and were placed into the higher ranking class in the school. The Civilian Medical School (Mekteb-I Tıbbiye-I Mülkiye) was founded in 1866 to raise the number of Muslim doctors. The school’s teachings were done in Turkish and focused on training students to become civilian physicians rather than military physicians.

Ottoman medicine in the mid-nineteenth century developed institutions for preventative medicine and public health. A quarantine office and quarantine council, the Meclis-I Tahaffuz-I Ulâ were established. The council eventually became an international organization with participation from European countries, the United States, Iran, and Russia. The Quarantine Administration, founded in 1838, established permanent anti-plague quarantines, based on the western Mediterranean quarantine model, throughout the Ottoman Empire.

The Ottoman Empire was also home to many institutions organized for the purpose of inoculation vaccination research and investigations. In Istanbul, the İstanbul Rabies and Bacteriological Laboratory was founded in 1877 for research in microbiology and the testing of rabies inoculation. The Smallpox Vaccination Laboratory and the Imperial Vaccination Center were also created in the late nineteenth century.

The first Ottoman hospital, Dar al-Shifa (literally "house of health"), was built in the Ottoman’s capital city of Bursa in 1399. This hospital and the ones built after were structured similarly to the ones of the Seljuk Empire, where "even wounded crusaders preferred Muslim doctors as they were very knowledgeable." However, in Ottoman hospitals, mentally ill patients were treated with music therapy in separated buildings that were still part of the hospital complex. Different mental illnesses were treated with different modes of music therapy. Ottoman Empire hospitals were primarily established and used for treating the sick then developed into centers for medical science teaching as well.

== Physics ==
In 1574, Taqi al-Din (1526–1585) wrote the last major Arabic work on optics, entitled Kitab Nūr hadaqat al-ibsār wa-nūr haqīqat al-anzār (Book of the Light of the Pupil of Vision and the Light of the Truth of the Sights), which contains experimental investigations in three volumes on vision, the light's reflection, and the light's refraction. The book deals with the structure of light, its diffusion and global refraction, and the relation between light and colour. In the first volume, he discusses "the nature of light, the source of light, the nature of the propagation of light, the formation of sight, and the effect of light on the eye and sight". In the second volume, he provides "experimental proof of the specular reflection of accidental as well as essential light, a complete formulation of the laws of reflection, and a description of the construction and use of a copper instrument for measuring reflections from plane, spherical, cylindrical, and conical mirrors, whether convex or concave." The third volume "analyses the important question of the variations light undergoes while traveling in mediums having different densities, i.e. the nature of refracted light, the formation of refraction, the nature of images formed by refracted light."

== Mechanical technology ==
In 1559, Taqi al-Din invented a six-cylinder 'Monoblock' pump. It was a hydropowered water-raising machine incorporating valves, suction and delivery pipes, piston rods with lead weights, trip levers with pin joints, and cams on the axle of a water-driven scoop-wheel. His 'Monobloc' pump could also create a partial vacuum.

=== Mechanical clocks ===
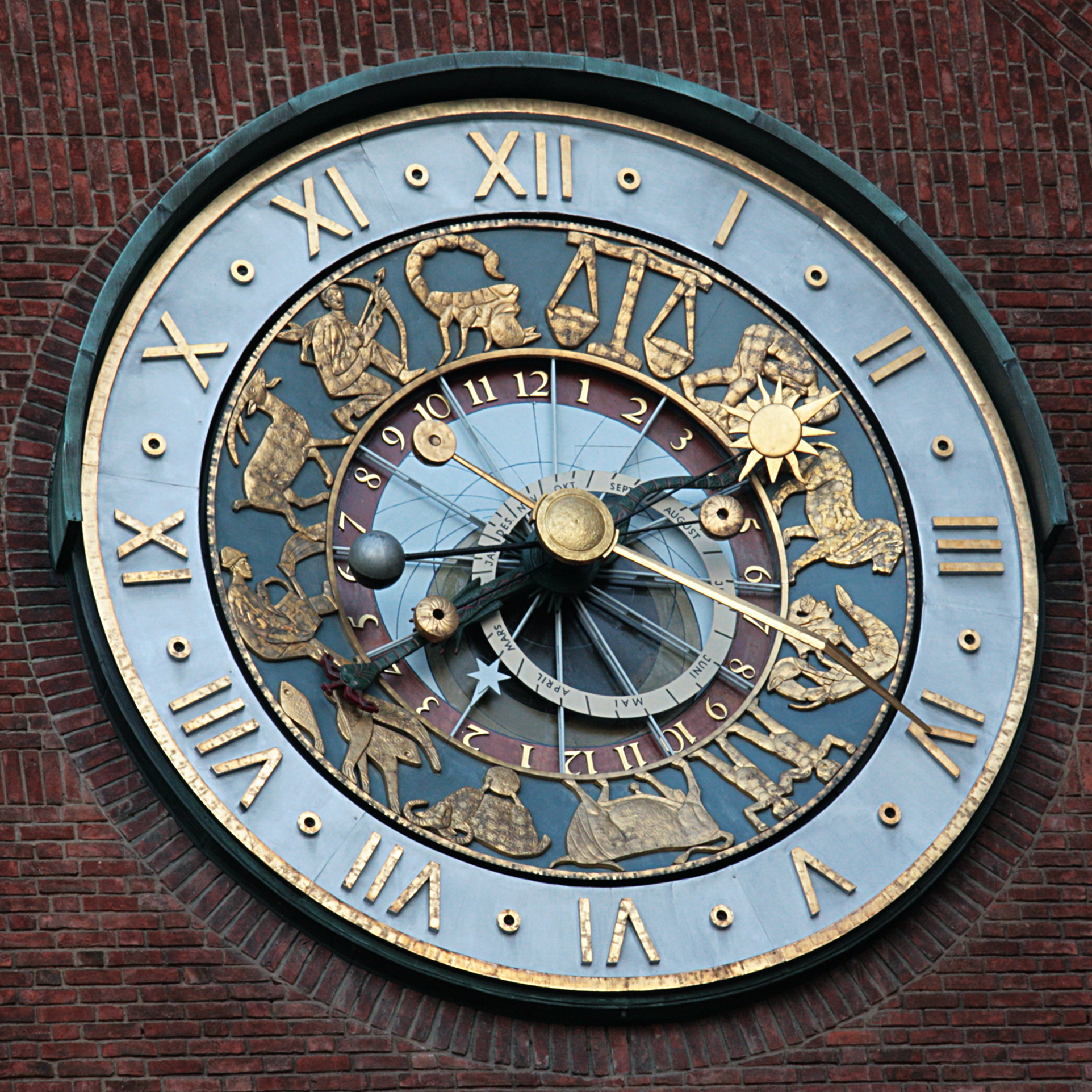
Example of astronomical clock like Taqi al-Din's invention.

The Ottoman engineer Taqi al-Din invented a mechanical astronomical clock, capable of striking an alarm at any time specified by the user. He described the clock in his book, The Brightest Stars for the Construction of Mechanical Clocks (Al-Kawākib al-durriyya fī wadh' al-bankāmat al-dawriyya), published in 1559. Similarly to earlier 15th-century European alarm clocks, his clock was capable of sounding at a specified time, achieved by placing a peg on the dial wheel. At the requested time, the peg activated a ringing device. This clock had three dials which showed the hours, degrees and minutes.

He later designed an observational clock to aid in observations at his Constantinople Observatory of Taqi ad-Din (1577–1580). In his treatise In The Nabk Tree of the Extremity of Thoughts, he wrote: "We constructed a mechanical clock with three dials which show the hours, the minutes, and the seconds. We divided each minute into five seconds". This was an important innovation in 16th-century practical astronomy, as at the start of the century clocks were not accurate enough to be used for astronomical purposes.

An example of a watch which measured time in minutes was created by an Ottoman watchmaker, Meshur Sheyh Dede, in 1702.

=== Steam power ===
In 1551, Taqi al-Din described an early example of an impulse steam turbine and also noted practical applications for a steam turbine as a prime mover for rotating a spit, predating Giovanni Branca's later impulse steam turbine from 1629. Taqi al-Din described such a device in his book, Al-Turuq al-saniyya fi al-alat al-ruhaniyya (The Sublime Methods of Spiritual Machines), completed in 1551 AD (959 AH). (See Steam jack.)

Ottoman Egyptian industries began moving towards steam power in the early 19th century. In Egypt under Muhammad Ali, industrial manufacturing was initially driven by machinery that relied on traditional energy sources, such as animal power, water wheels, and windmills, which were also the principle energy sources in Western Europe up until around 1870. Under Muhammad Ali of Egypt in the early 19th century, steam engines were introduced to Egyptian industrial manufacturing, with boilers manufactured and installed in industries such as ironworks, textile manufacturing, paper mills, and hulling mills. While there was a lack of coal deposits in Egypt, prospectors searched for coal deposits there, and imported coal from overseas, at similar prices to what imported coal cost in France, until the 1830s, when Egypt gained access to coal sources in Lebanon, which had a yearly coal output of 4,000 tons. Compared to Western Europe, Egypt also had superior agriculture and an efficient transport network through the Nile. Economic historian Jean Batou argues that the necessary economic conditions for rapid industrialization existed in Egypt during the 1820s–1830s, as well as for the adoption of oil as a potential energy source for its steam engines later in the 19th century.

== Military ==
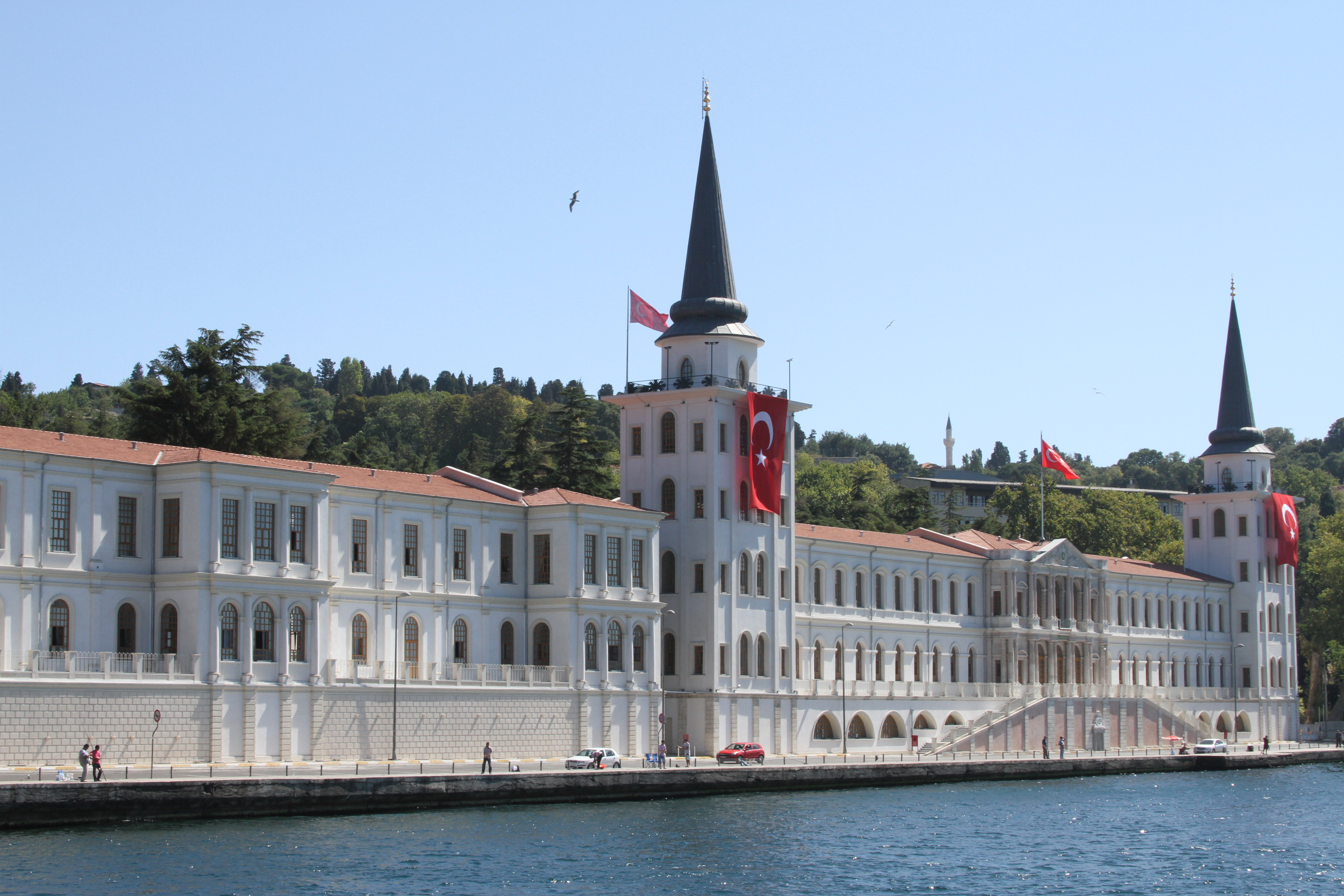
Kuleli Military High School in Istanbul near Bosphorus.

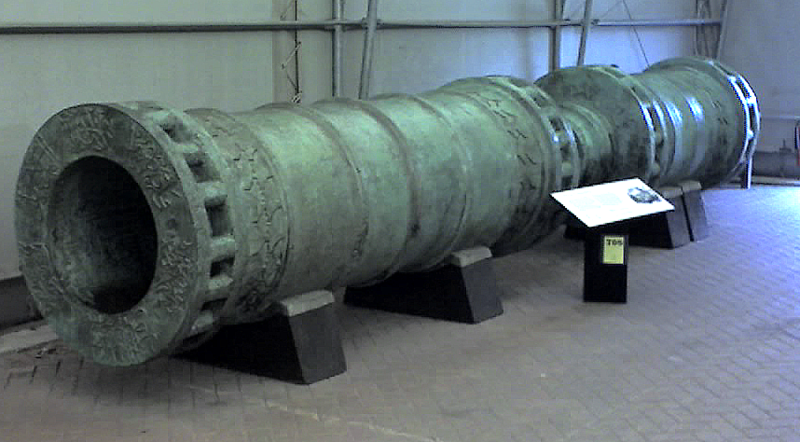
The cast-bronze Dardanelles Gun from 1464

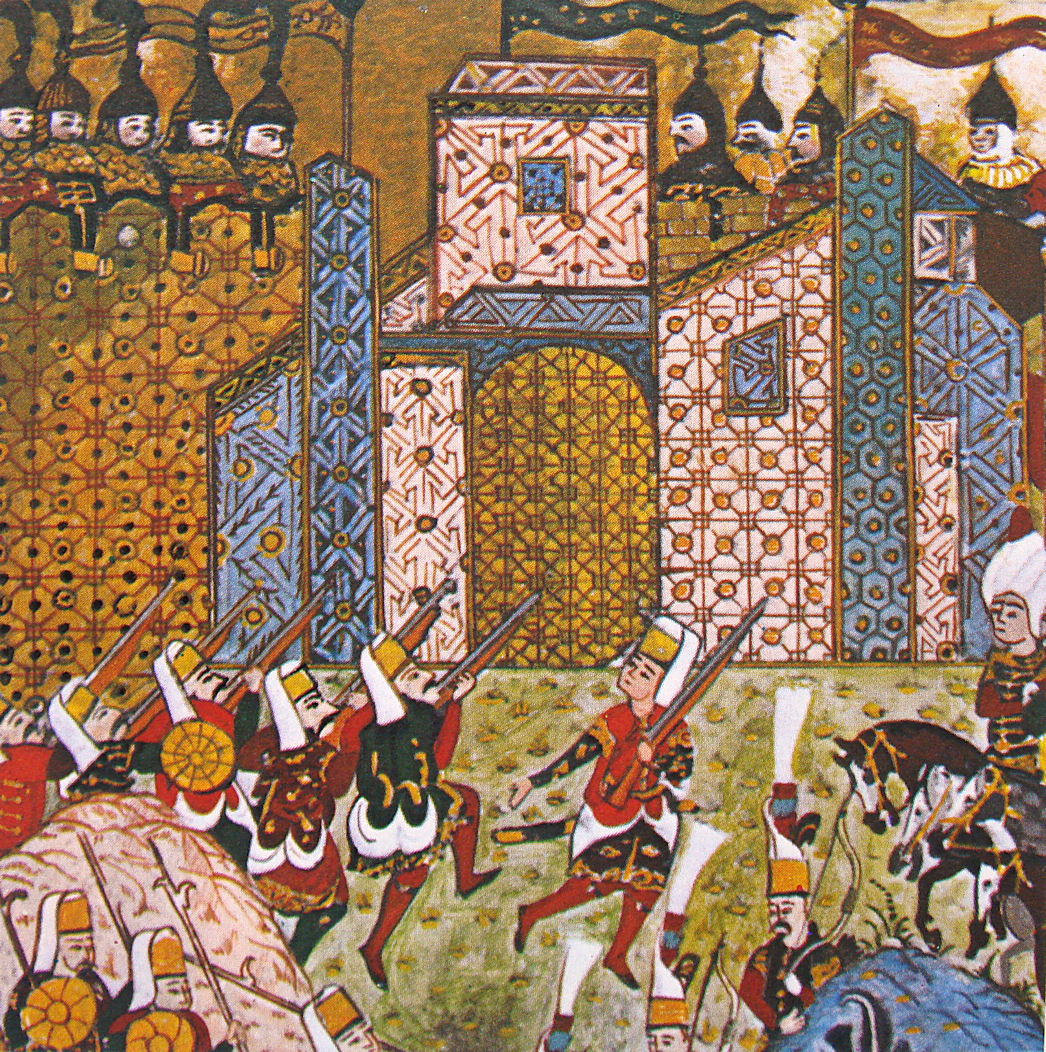
The Ottoman Janissary corps were using matchlock muskets since the 1440s. They are depicted battling the Knights Hospitaller in this 1522 painting.

The Ottoman Empire in the 16th century was known for their military power throughout southern Europe and the Middle East. The Harquebus, "also spelled arquebus, also called hackbut, first gun fired from the shoulder, a smoothbore matchlock with a stock resembling that of a rifle". It was also first appeared in the Ottoman Empire and was referred to as a handgun. The German Gun was obtained by the German word "hooked gun".

Ottoman artillery included a number of cannons, most of which were designed by Turkish engineers, in addition to a cannon designed by Hungarian engineer Orban, who had earlier offered his services to the Byzantine Empire emperor Constantine XI. Orban's price for the cannons was high, so the Byzantine emperor of Constantinople was not able to afford it. Mehmed II was determined to win the battle, and used cannons to blast through Constantinople's huge wall during the siege of Constantinople on 6 April 1453.

The Dardanelles Gun was designed and cast in bronze in 1464 by Munir Ali, weighed nearly a ton, and had a length of 5.18m. The large gun operated a 635mm caliber rounds and was able to fire marble boulders. To put things into perspective, this round was nearly 6 times larger than the main British tank caliber gun at 120mm. The Dardanelles Gun was still present for duty more than 340 years later in 1807, when a Royal Navy force appeared and commenced the Dardanelles Operation. Turkish forces loaded the ancient relics with propellant and projectiles, then fired them at the British ships. The British squadron suffered 28 casualties from this bombardment.

The musket appeared in the Ottoman Empire by 1465. Damascus steel was used in the production of firearms such as the musket from the 16th century. A musket is a long gun which materialized in the Ottoman Empire by 1465. These were large hand-held guns made out of steel and were capable of penetrating heavy armor; however, these guns by the mid-16th century disappeared because heavy armor declined. There were many more versions of the musket which eventually became known as the rifle. In the 15th century the Ottomans had perfected the musket by creating a gun that used a lever and spring. These were much more easy to use during combat. Eventually the rifle as we know today ended the era of the musket.

Turkish arquebuses may have reached China before Portuguese ones. In 1598, Chinese writer Zhao Shizhen described Turkish muskets as being superior to Japanese muskets.

The Chinese military book Wu Pei Chih (1621) describes a Turkish musket that, rather than using a matchlock mechanism, instead uses a rack-and-pinion mechanism. On release of the trigger, the two racks return automatically to their original positions. This was the first time a rack-and-pinion mechanism is known to have been used in a firearm, with no evidence of its use in any European or East-Asian firearms at the time.

The Ottoman Empire military was also tactically proficient in the use of small arms weapons such as rifles and handguns. Like many other great powers, the Ottomans issued the M1903 Mauser bolt-action rifle to its most elite front-line infantry and cavalry soldiers, also known as Janissaries. With a five-round box magazine and maximum effective range of 600 meters, the Ottomans were able to effectively engage enemy soldiers when they were unable to utilize field artillery cannons. Second line units, or Jardamas, were primarily issued obsolete single shot weapons such as the M1887 rifle, M1874 rifle or older modeled revolvers. Officers in the Ottoman Empire Army were authorized to purchase their own personal handguns from the various number of European craftsmen.

== See also ==
- List of Ottoman scientists
- Ali Qushji
- Hezarfen Ahmet Celebi, Ottoman aviator
- Lagari Hasan Celebi, Ottoman aviator
- List of inventions in the medieval Islamic world
- Piri Reis
- Science in the medieval Islamic world
- Taqi ad-Din Muhammad ibn Ma'ruf
- Timeline of science and engineering in the Islamic world
