= Saraçoğlu =

Saraçoğlu may refer to:

== Architecture ==
- Şükrü Saracoğlu Stadium, football stadium located in the Kadıköy district of Istanbul, Turkey
- Saraçoğlu Sport Complex, multi-purpose outdoor arena in Karatay, Konya, Turkey

== People ==
- Afra Saraçoğlu (born 1997), Turkish actress and model
- İbrahim Adnan Saraçoğlu (born 1949), Turkish chemistry professor, biochemist, microbiologist and researcher
- Murat Saraçoğlu (born 1970), Turkish director
- Rüşdü Saracoğlu (1948–2025), Turkish economist and politician
- Şükrü Saracoğlu (1887–1953), Turkish politician
