= SIAF =

SIAF may refer to:

- Safety Investigation Authority of Finland
- Swiss Institute of Allergy and Asthma Research
