= Nami =

Nami or NAMI may refer to:

== Abbreviations ==
- National Alliance on Mental Illness, an American nonprofit support and advocacy organization
- Noah's Ark Ministries International, a search team to find Noah's Ark
- North American Meat Institute, an American non-profit, industry trade association
- Central Scientific Research Automobile and Automotive Engines Institute, a Russian scientific automotive institute, see NAMI (automotive institute)

== People and fictional characters ==
- Nami (name), a list of people and fictional characters with the given name or surname Nami

== Other uses ==
- Nami (film), 1952 Japanese film
- Namiseom, also known as Nami Island, a tiny island in Chuncheon, South Korea

== See also ==
- Na Mi (disambiguation)
- Name (disambiguation)
- Namie (disambiguation)
- Naminatha, 21st Jain Tirthankara
- Nammi (disambiguation)
- Namy
