= Namie (disambiguation) =

Namie is a town in Fukushima Prefecture, Japan.

Namie may also refer to:

== Places ==
- Namie Station

== People ==
=== Given name ===
- Namie Amuro (born 1977), Japanese singer
- Namie Odama (born 1979), Japanese mangaka
- Namie Shimabukuro (born 1998), Japanese professional footballer

=== Surname ===
- Gary Namie, American psychologist
- Ruth F. Namie, American psychologist

=== Fictional characters ===
- Namie, character in the Marvel Universe
- Namie Amamiya, character in Forest of Piano
- Namie Yagiri, character in Durarara!!
