= List of Ottoman scientists =

Here is a list of Ottoman scientists by century.

== Before the 16th century ==
- Kadi zada al Rumi (1364–1429), mathematician and astronomer
- Sabuncuoğlu Şerafeddin (1385–1468), physician
- Akşemseddin (1389–1459), physician and philosopher
- Ali Kuşçu (1403–1474), mathematician, astronomer, physicist, philosopher, theologian
- Mirim Çelebi (1450–1525), mathematician and astronomer
- Ahi Mehmet Çelebi (1450–1500), physician

== 16th century ==
- Muhammed Konevi (1450–1524), astronomer
- Matrakçi Nasuh (1480–1564), mathematician
- Mimar Sinan (1488–1588), architect
- Mustafa Muvakkit (1498–1571), astronomer
- Piri Reis (1465–1554), geographer
- Seydi Ali Reis (1498–1564), mathematician and admiral
- Taki-aldin (1521–1585), mathematician, astronomer, physicist, optics, mechanics, watchmaker
- Emir Çelebi (1560–1600), physician and historian
