= Cezmi Akdis =

Medical Researcher

Cezmi Akdis is a medical researcher in the field of immunology. He is director of the Swiss Institute of Allergy and Asthma Research (SIAF) in Davos, Switzerland and the editor in chief of the journal Allergy.

He has been a professor in University of Zürich Medical Faculty since 2006, and one of the directors of the Christine Kühne-Center for Allergy Research and Education in Davos, Switzerland.

== Education & Early Career ==
Akdis received his medical degree from Uludag University Medical Faculty, Bursa, Turkey in 1985. He has specialized in infectious disease and clinical microbiology 1991 and in immunology at Uludag University in 1994, and further was named a Venia Legendi (Habilitation) at the University of Zürich 2002.

== Academic career ==
Cezmi Akdis began his medical career as a General Practitioner at Gölhisar Health Center, Turkey, in 1985.He completed a five-year residency in Infectious Diseases followed by two years of specialization in Immunology at Uludağ University, Bursa, Turkey, in 1987. In 1993, he was appointed assistant professor at Uludağ University, Bursa. Between 1993 and 1994, he worked as a research fellow at Ciba-Geigy Ltd., Allergy Research, Basel, Switzerland. From 1994, he joined the Swiss Institute of Allergy and Asthma Research (SIAF) in Davos, Switzerland, first as a Research Fellow and from 1998 as Group Leader. He received his “Venia Legendi” (Habilitation) from the University of Zurich Medical Faculty in 2002. In 2006, he was appointed Extraordinarius Professor at the University of Zurich Medical Faculty, with promotion rights in 2008 from the Science Faculty. He became Ordinarius Professor at the University of Zurich Medical Faculty in 2013.

== Academic history ==
- President of the European Academy of Allergy & Clinical Immunology (14,000 members) between 2011 and 2013
- Executive committee member between 2003 and 2015 and vice president between 2007 and 2011
- Directorium member, CK-CARE Davos 2009
- Senate member of the Swiss Academy of Medical Sciences, 2014
- Editor of three Global Atlases. Allergy, Asthma, and Allergic Rhinitis and Chronic Rhinosinusitis
- Associate editor 2007-2015 Journal of Allergy and Clinical Immunology
- Co-editor-in-chief 2015-2018 Journal of Allergy and Clinical Immunology
- Board member of Academia Raetica, Canton GR, since 2016
- Board member, SRISM Davos 2018
- Editor-in-chief of Allergy 2018–present

== Publications ==
Akdis has published more than 750 peer-reviewed articles in the fields of allergy and immunology. His current h-index is 169. He has also been recognized as a Highly Cited Researcher by Clarivate (formerly Thomson Reuters), reflecting his significant impact in the field of immunology.

== Scientific Achievements ==
In all below listed original first time reported major scientific achievements Dr. Akdis was the first or senior author of the study.

- Demonstration of immune regulation and allergen tolerance: Plasticity of antigen/allergen-specific T cells, 1996 Journal of Clinical Investigation. This study for the first time demonstrates switch between antigen-specific human T cell subsets and brings the concept of allergen-specific T cell plasticity.
- Demonstration of human T and B regulatory cells, 1998 Journal of Clinical Investigation. This study for the first time demonstrates human regulatory T and B cells in vivo during venom allergen tolerance in beekeepers and be venom immunotherapy.
- Immune suppressive role of histamine receptor 2 and counter regulation of T cells subsets by histamine receptor 1 and 2.
- Mechanisms of eczema in atopic dermatitis and contact dermatitis and epithelial barrier damage by immune inflammatory response.
- Demonstration of human in vivo antigen-specific Treg cell vs Th2 cell balance.
- In vivo human allergen tolerance model (bee venom and beekeepers) and human Treg cells, 2008 Journal of Experimental Medicine.
- Demonstration of transcriptional regulation of Foxp3 by RUNX 1 and 3.
- Demonstration of human Type 2 NK cell subset, 2002, European Journal of Immunology.
- Mechanisms of epithelial barrier defect in asthma and chronic rhinosinusitis, 2003 - 2009, Journal of Allergy and Clinical Immunology.
- Demonstration of human regulatory NK Cells, 2008 Journal of Immunology.
- First studies mentioning endotypes of asthma and other allergic inflammatory diseases.
- Demonstration of human regulatory innate lymphoid cells.
- More than 50 European Guideline articles and Position papers (Food Allergy, Allergen Immunotherapy, Biologicals, Environmental Influence in our discipline, including the leadership, organization and publication the first European Guideline in the area of Food Allergy.
- Basis for “Epithelial barrier hypothesis” for the development of allergic and autoimmune disease, 2000-2025, More than 40 original research articles.
- More than 40, first time published COVID-19 articles, focused on mechanisms, allergy patient care during COVID-19 and severity, including the first cases of human to human infection of 140 subjects published in 19 February 2020, before the cases started in Europe.

Invention and development of a device for skin barrier detection: Early studies on epithelial barrier ended up with the development of a skin impedancemeter device called NaviSense from SciBase Sweden for allergic and inflammatory skin disease. First prototype was developed together with CSEM Landquart in 2013. Clinical validation studies are published by SIAF. Currently available for clinical usage, FDA certified, a new version that detects skin barrier in 1 second has been recently developed.

Development of the Epithelial Barrier Theory: This theory explains reasons for the development and increased prevalence of many chronic non-communicable diseases, such as allergic, autoimmune, metabolic and neurodegenerative diseases. There has been a steep rise in these diseases, reaching epidemic proportions and now affecting almost two billions of humans. Intact skin and mucosal barriers are crucial for the maintenance of tissue homeostasis as they protect host tissues from infections, environmental toxins, pollutants and allergens. A defective epithelial barrier has been demonstrated in allergic and autoimmune conditions such as asthma, atopic dermatitis, allergic rhinitis, chronic rhinosinusitis, eosinophilic esophagitis, coeliac disease, and inflammatory bowel disease. In addition, leakiness of the gut epithelium is also implicated in systemic autoimmune and metabolic conditions such as diabetes, obesity, multiple sclerosis, rheumatoid arthritis, systemic lupus erythematosus, ankylosing spondylitis, and autoimmune hepatitis. Finally, distant inflammatory responses due to a ‘leaky gut’ and microbiome changes are suspected in Alzheimer’s disease, Parkinson’s disease, chronic depression and autism spectrum disorders. These diseases are more common in industrialized countries and their prevalence continues to rise in developing countries in parallel to urbanization and industrialization. Akdis group has introduced the “epithelial barrier theory”, which proposes that the rise in epithelial barrier damaging agents linked to industrialization, urbanization and modern life underlies the rise in allergic, autoimmune and other chronic conditions and has an influence on microbes and other animals in the nature.

The barrier theory suggests a need for avoidance of the environmental cues, and warrants further studies on safe levels of exposure to potentially harmful substances, such as inhaled and ingested detergents, ingestion of processed foods containing emulsifiers, exposure to particulate matter, diesel exhaust, microplastics, and certain nanoparticles. As Paracelsus said in 1493, “sola dosis facit venenum”, translating to all substances are poisons, everything has the potential to become toxic, it merely depends on the dose.

=== Honors ===
- Ferdinand Wortman Prize, 1996
- Hoechst Marion Roussel Award, 1998
- Professor Hans Storck Award, 1998
- Dr.-Karl Heyer-Preis, 1998
- Sedat Simavi Medicine Award, 1998
- Allergopharma Award, 2001
- Turkish Science Association, TUBITAK Exclusive Award,2007
- European Allergy Research “Gold Medal”, 2004
- BUSIAD Award, 2012
- American Academy of Allergy Asthma and Immunology (AAAAI) Elliot Middleton Memorial Lecture, 2014
- European Federation of Immunology Societies, World Immunology Day Lecture, 2014
- European Academy of Allergy and Clinical Immunology 2016 Paul Ehrlich Award.
- Swiss Society of Allergy Immunology honorary membership, 2017
- Honorary member of the Swiss Society of Allergy Immunology (SGAI-SSAI), 2018
- Honorary member, Fellow of European Academy of Allergy Clinical Immunology (EAACI), 2018
- Honorary Professor in Capital Medical University, National Tongren Hospital, Beijing Institute of Otolaryngologology, China
- Canton of Grissons Cantonal Recognition Prize, 2020
- Harold Nelson Memorial Lecture (AAAAI), 2021
- Erich Fuchs Prize (German Allergy Association), 2021
- Honorary Professor, Bursa-Uludag University, 2021
- Asia Pacific Allergy Clinical immunology Society, Life-time achievement award, 2022
- Honorary Professor, Harvard University, 2023
- Affiliate Professor Hangzhou Zieziyang University, China 2024
- Visiting Professor Peking University, Beijing, China 2025
- Cezmi Akdis Prize Given by the EAACI to Young Scientists, 2025

Conference / Congress Organizations

- Founder and organizer of World Immune Regulation Meetings, Davos
- Founder and organizer of the first EAACI Immunology Winter Schools, 2001
- Congress President EAACI Congress 2012 Geneva, EAACI/WAO (World Allergy Congress) 2013 Milan
