= Enten controversy =

2009 Japanese fraud case

“Because of the financial crisis, countries will adopt the enten in three years' time. I will start shining and become world famous. I will certainly move the world.”

— Kazutsugi Nami talking to the Japanese press.

The Enten controversy involved Kazutsugi Nami, the chairman of Tokyo bedding supplier Ladies & Gentlemen (L&G), arrested by Japanese police on 5 February 2009. He and twenty-one other executives were accused of defrauding 37,000 investors of at least 126 billion yen (approximately US$1.4 billion) between 2001 and 2009. Nami is the inventor of a quasi-currency, "Enten", which he used to attract investors. Some sources put the total amount of the money involved as high as 226 billion yen, which would make it, if proven, to be the biggest investment fraud in Japanese history since Toyota Shoji, an investment group, defrauded investors of 202.5 billion yen in the late '80s.

In order to gain credibility and popularity, Nami's company used famous enka singers such as Takashi Hosokawa in their advertisements. In May 2008, Hosokawa was accused by the Japanese civil court of participating, but he insisted that he was not responsible for the content of their advertisement.

== L&G ==
Ladies and Gentlemen, set up in 1987, originally sold futons and health food, and began accepting investment money in 2001. The company's established existence tricked many into believing it was stable. A 65-year-old woman who lost 30 million yen (about US$300,000) saved over four decades was quoted as saying: "I thought the company was fine as it was in business for a long time". Another woman, a 70-year-old who blamed herself for the loss of two million yen (about US$20,000), said: "I had fun and a lively life ... I was stupid. It's my fault as I was greedy."

== Enten ==
Since 2004 Nami had been issuing special electronic money which he referred to as Enten (円天; a combination of the Japanese currency name, yen, and the Japanese word for heaven) to investors who paid at least ¥100,000 (approx. £750, US$1,100). Enten was a virtual currency that Nami expected to become legal tender in the post-recession by which time he will also have become "world famous." Investors were promised 36% annual returns. There was even an "Enten fair" during which participants sang the praises of Nami's investment plan. One woman described the existence of Enten as "wonderful", whilst another said: "It's like a dream, I can buy anything."

"Enten" were generated through his customers' mobile phones and could be used to purchase items online, including vegetables, futons, clothing, and jewelry. In February 2007, L&G dividends were distributed in Enten, rather than in cash, which caused many lawsuits and cancellations of accounts. In October 2007, police searched L&G's headquarters in Tokyo, suspecting that the company had violated investment laws. The company declared bankruptcy in November 2007.

Nami denies allegations of any wrongdoing. He had built up a cult-like following amongst his investors. Lawyers representing these victims say Nami believed he had a "divine decree" to "eliminate poverty from this world".

== Arrest ==
Nami was drinking beer when police, followed by reporters, arrested him in a restaurant where he was eating his breakfast close to his Tokyo office at 5:30 a.m. local time on 4 February 2009. Nami and other company executives were arrested on suspicion of violating the Law for Punishment of Organized Crimes. Nami declared his innocence as he was led away by the police, accusing them of destroying his business. Arrested before television cameras, Nami insisted: "Time will tell if I'm a conman or a swindler. I'm leading 50,000 people. Can they charge a company this big with fraud?" Shortly beforehand, he had been asked about his feelings for those who had lost money: "No. I have put my life at stake. Why do I have to apologize? I'm the poorest victim. Nobody lost more than I did. You should be aware that high returns come with a high risk."

On March 18, 2010, Nami was sentenced to 18 years in prison for his scheme.

== See also ==
- Non-fungible token
- Bitcoin
- Cryptocurrency
