= Katarzyna Sanak-Kosmowska =

Polish marketing/public relations theorist, academic, author, and professor (born 1984)

- Born: 21 December 1984 (age 41)
- Citizenship: Polish
- Education: Jagiellonian University
- Occupations: Marketing theorist, academic
- Website: sanak.pl

Katarzyna Julia Sanak-Kosmowska (born 21 December 1984) is a Polish marketing and public relations theorist and researcher, associate professor and head of the Marketing Department at the Kraków University of Economics.

== Biography ==
She was born in 1984 as the daughter of Marek Sanak, a molecular biologist; and Iwona Sanak, a dentist. She attended the Bartłomiej Nowodworski High School in Kraków, where she passed the matriculation exam. Subsequently, she graduated with Bachelor's (2006) and Master's degree (2008) in management and marketing from the Jagiellonian University. In 2006, she studied at the IECS – The Strasbourg Graduate School of Management within the Socrates-Erasmus programme. In 2010, she graduated with master's degree in psychology from the Jagiellonian University.

Initially, she became an online marketing and social media specialist, and conducted trainings for private companies. In 2015, she started working as an assistant in the Department of Marketing at the Kraków University of Economics. There, she has been holding an assistant professorship since October 2017, after having obtained a PhD in economics in the field of management sciences in 2017 at the Kraków University of Economics, on the basis of the dissertation The Role of Social Networking Sites in Brand Marketing Communication supervised by Jan W. Wiktor. She has also been teaching at the Jagiellonian University, starting in 2020.

In May 2021, she became the coordinator of the “UEK Pomaga” (UEK Helps) project, aimed at “building social responsibility in the academic community”, among others by “supporting pro-ecological attitudes” and providing various forms of assistance “in the name of implementing the principle of social solidarity”, implemented within the “UEK Responsible” Program at the Kraków University of Economics. Since October 2021, she has been the director of the MBA CSB+ Master Program at the Kraków School of Business at the Kraków University of Economics. She coordinates the School of Elementary Academic Didactics at the Kraków University of Economics.

She published her PhD as a monograph in 2018, and by 2022 she co-authored six other books and more than twenty papers in academic journals (Note: Including in the journals: Prace Naukowe Uniwersytetu Ekonomicznego we Wrocławiu, Studia i Prace Wydziału Nauk Ekonomicznych i Zarządzania Uniwersytetu Szczecińskiego, Zeszyty Naukowe Uniwersytetu Ekonomicznego w Poznaniu, and Polish Sociological Review.) and contributed more than twenty chapters to monographs. In her research, she focused mainly on the issues of marketing communication, psychology of consumer behaviour and digital marketing. She researched on the impact of advertising on consumers, remembering ads, cognitive errors, manipulation and persuasion techniques in advertising, open innovation and crowdsourcing.

She was elected a member of the Polish Scientific Society of Marketing (2017), American Marketing Association (2018), International Association of Researchers and Scientists in Latvia and the Spokesmen of Science Association (Note: Polish: Stowarzyszenie Rzecznicy Nauki.) (2018).

She has been teaching at the Children's University at the Kraków University of Economics since 2011. For several years, she has been teaching at various children's universities around Poland. In February 2018, she has been visiting at the HAMK Häme University of Applied Sciences within the Erasmus program. She has been visiting also at the Vienna University of Economics and Business, Santo Domingo Institute of Technology and Clark University. She completed several teaching and training courses, including the course Masters of Didactics provided by the Ghent University. In 2021, she has co-written a critical performance on ageism shown at the Open Eyes Economy Summit.

In 2017 and 2018, she was awarded the Kraków University of Economics Rector's Award as the “lecturer best rated by the students”.

In September 2026, she was appointed head of the Marketing Department at the Kraków University of Economics.

== Books ==
=== As author ===
- Rola serwisów społecznościowych w komunikacji marketingowej marki (Wydawnictwa Drugie 2018)
- Komunikacja rynkowa: podstawy teoretyczne i ćwiczenia (co-author with Magdalena Dołhasz; Wydawnictwo Uniwersytetu Ekonomicznego w Krakowie 2019)
- Człowiek wśród innych ludzi (co-author with Anna Karwińska; Uniwersytet Ekonomiczny w Krakowie, 2020)
- Kultura: to co wyróżnia człowieka (co-author with Anna Karwińska; Uniwersytet Ekonomiczny w Krakowie, 2020)
- Jak działa społeczeństwo (co-author with Anna Karwińska and Norbert Laurisz; Uniwersytet Ekonomiczny w Krakowie, 2020)
- Information Asymmetry in Online Advertising (co-author with Jan W. Wiktor; Routledge 2021)
- Evaluating Social Media Marketing. Social Proof and Online Buyer Behaviour (Routledge 2022)

=== As editor ===
- Uniwersytet i edukacja wobec wyzwań współczesności (co-editor with Stanisław Mazur and Norbert Laurisz; Uniwersytet Ekonomiczny w Krakowie, 2021)
- Uniwersytet Odpowiedzialny. Edukacja w zakresie przedsiębiorczości cyfrowej. Podręcznik dla nauczycieli i rodziców (co-editor with Norbert Laurisz; Uniwersytet Ekonomiczny w Krakowie, 2021)

== Awards ==
- Award of the Rector of the Kraków University of Economics, 3rd degree for individual teaching achievements as the “lecturer best rated by the students” (2017)
- Award of the Rector of the Kraków University of Economics, 3rd degree for individual teaching achievements as the “lecturer best rated by the students” (2018)
