= Nammi =

Nammi may refer to:

- Diana Nammi, Kurdish and British activist
- Dongfeng Nammi, a Chinese electric vehicle company

== See also ==
- Nami (disambiguation)
