= Kazutsugi Nami =

Japanese businessman

Kazutsugi Nami (波 和二, Nami Kazutsugi, b. 19 May 1933 in Mie Prefecture) is a Japanese businessman and chairman of Tokyo-based bedding supplier Ladies & Gentlemen (L&G). He has been involved in a number of fraudulent schemes since the 1970s, and was arrested most recently on 4 February 2009 on suspicion of orchestrating a massive investor fraud involving the "Enten" quasi-currency.

== APO Japan ==
In the 1970s, Nami became vice president of APO Japan Co., an auto equipment sales company in Tokyo. The company was involved in a pyramid scheme, collecting investments from about 250,000 people in a scam based on sales of exhaust gas removal devices. The company's operations became a social problem, and it went bankrupt in 1975.

== Nozakku ==
In 1973, before the bankruptcy of APO Japan, Nami established Nozakku Co., a company which sold "magic stones" that were claimed to turn tapwater into natural water. The company's annual sales reached more than 2 billion yen a year before it too went bankrupt in 1978. Nami was arrested in September 1978 by Mie Prefectural police on suspicion of fraud, and was sentenced to prison.

== PHC ==
Before his arrest in 1978, Nami also established PHC, a company selling pressure cookers.

== L&G and "Enten" ==
After being released from prison, Nami established the Tokyo-based bedding company L&G in August 1987. The company allegedly derived its income from a pyramid scheme. At L&G, he invented the "Enten" quasi-currency (literally meaning Divine Money in Japanese). In February 2007, L&G dividends were distributed in Enten, rather than in cash, resulting in lawsuits and cancellations of accounts. In October 2007, police searched L&Gs headquarters in Tokyo, suspecting that the company had violated investment laws, and the company declared bankruptcy in November 2007. Nami was arrested in Tokyo on 4 February 2009 on suspicion of large-scale investor fraud along with twenty-one of his associates. He insists that he is innocent, and is the victim and not the villain. On March 18, 2010, Nami was sentenced to 18 years in prison for his scheme.
