= Academia Raetica =

Swiss research association

Academia Raetica, based in Davos, is the association for the promotion of science, research and education in the Canton of Graubünden and its surroundings. Its members include thirty research institutes, universities and clinics. It was founded in 2006 with the purpose of promoting young scientists, networking its members with each other and representing their interests in politics and in public.

== Mandate ==
Based on a mandate from the Canton of Graubünden, the Academia Raetica promotes the continuing education, work and development of scientists through transferable skills courses and networking activities. It connects and supports its members in cooperation projects with each other as well as with research institutions outside the canton. It communicates with cantonal offices and industrial partners and promotes dialogue between the disciplines. It also informs the public and politicians about the social and economic importance of research in the canton. It supports the government in the implementation of its higher education, research and innovation strategy. Academia Raetica was last evaluated in 2018 by the Swiss Agency for Accreditation and Quality Assurance.

== Activities ==
• Information and advice for scientists newly moving to the canton • Public relations • Information for researchers, institutions, politics and the general public • Conference "Graubünden forscht" for networking and exchange among researchers from different institutions and disciplines (next event in 2024) • Representation in regional development projects • Launching and working on joint projects of member institutions

== Members and partner institutions ==
=== Individual members ===
Individual members of the association are natural persons who are interested in the purpose of the association. They include founding members and other members.

=== Research institutions ===
- AO Foundation, Davos
- AO Education Institute, Davos
- AO Research Institute, Davos
- Cardio-CARE AG, Davos
- Christine Kühne – Center for Allergy Research and Education, Davos
- CSEM Landquart
- Institut dal Dicziunari Rumantsch Grischun, Chur
- Institut für Kulturforschung Graubünden, Chur
- Physikalisch-Meteorologisches Observatorium Davos, Davos
- Schweizerisches Forschungsinstitut für Hochgebirgsklima und Medizin, Davos
- Schweizerischer Nationalpark, Zernez
- Schweizerisches Institut für Allergie- und Asthmaforschung, Davos
- Stiftung für Gastroenterologische Chirurgie, Davos
- Swiss Research Institute for Sports Medicine SRISM
- WSL-Institut für Schnee- und Lawinenforschung SLF, Davos

=== Universities, applied universities ===
- Fachhochschule Graubünden, Chur
- Pädagogische Hochschule Graubünden, Chur
- Theologische Hochschule Chur
- SUPSI, Manno/Ticino
- THIM – Die internationale Hochschule für Physiotherapie, Landquart

=== Clinics ===
- Clinica Holistica Engiadina, Susch
- Departement Chirurgie, Kantonsspital Graubünden, Chur
- Departement Frauenklinik, Kantonsspital Graubünden, Chur
- Departement Innere Medizin, Kantonsspital Graubünden, Chur
- Hochgebirgsklinik Davos, Davos
- Klinik für Neurologie und Neurorehabilitation, Kliniken Valens, Valens
- Klinik für Rheumatologie und muskuloskelettale Rehabilitation, Kliniken Valens, Pfäfers
- Psychiatrische Dienste Graubünden, Chur
- Spital Davos, Davos

=== Partner institutions ===
- Davos Destinations Organisation, Davos
- Frauenkulturarchiv Graubünden, Chur
- Gemeinde Davos
- Gemeinde Landquart
- Gehirn- und Traumastiftung Graubünden, Chur
- ibW Höhere Fachschule Südostschweiz
- Lab42, Davos
- Private Universität im Fürstentum Liechtenstein, Triesen
- UNESCO-Welterbe Tektonikarena Sardona, Sargans
- Verein Bündner Pärke, Wergenstein
- Wissensstadt Davos
- ZHAW Institut für Umwelt und Natürliche Ressourcen IUNR, Wergenstein
