= Nami Asada =

Japanese model

- Born: 1953 or 1954 (age 72–73); Edogawa-ku, Tokyo, Japan
- Occupation: Gravure model
- Years active: 1973-78

Nami Asada (麻田奈美, Asada Nami; born 1953–54) is a gravure model who was active in Japan in the 1970s. She became a star after a photograph known as the Apple Nude (りんごヌード, ringo nūdo), and was elevated to the status of an idol among young people of the time.

== Life and career ==
Born in Edogawa ward, Tokyo, she studied classical ballet in elementary school and joined the basketball club in junior high school. By the time she graduated from Tokyo Metropolitan Musashigaoka High School, she got a voluptuous figure and an ample bust. Despite her body shape, she was petite, standing in the 150 cm (4.9 ft) range, and had a youthful, innocent face. Her mother commissioned photographer Yoichi Aoyagi to take nude photographs of her daughter in the fall of 1972, when she was 18. This led to her debut in magazine gravure, and she became an instant sensation when her first gravure photos were published in the January 29, 1973 issue of Heibon Punch.

Asada's claim to fame was a single double-page spread by Aoyagi, published in the March 12, 1973 issue of Heibon Punch. This photograph, in which she modestly covered her crotch with a red apple, was called the "Apple Nude," and posters of it that were later sold were said to be a staple in the rooms of young people at the time. Due to the overwhelming response, Asada's gravure photos were exclusively published in Heibon Punch, and the issues featuring her nudes saw a massive increase in circulation, with some sources saying they exceeded one million copies at their peak.

In 1973, she also gained attention for activities outside of gravure modeling, such as appearing in TV commercials for Honda and Yashica, and making her record debut with Nippon Columbia ("Osoi Natsu / Cattleya no Hana"). At one point, she received a leading role offer from director Kei Kumai, but Asada's mother objected, citing that Nikkatsu, the production company that was scheduled to produce the film, mainly produced pornographic films, and that she had an obligation to "get married safely" (not to let her appear in a Roman Porno film with scenes of sexual interaction with the opposite sex), thus canceling the film role. Kumai restarted the project and produced "Asayake no Uta" (1973) with Keiko Sekine in the lead role, which was released by Toho.

Since her debut, Aoyagi has handled almost all of her gravure photography. There have been few shoots by other photographers, especially nudes. At the height of her popularity in 1974, she suddenly distanced herself from gravure and took a break. She lived a carefree life, using the money she saved from her modeling fees to travel abroad several times a year, but when her savings ran out, she returned to gravure in 1976.

In 1977, after collaborating with Aoyagi again to pose for semi-nude photos, she finally shot a full nude photoshoot. Her work with Aoyagi ended with the photobook "Nami Asada: A Record of Youth," which was the culmination of five years of work published in "Heibon Punch." However, immediately afterward, from 1977 to 1978, she was featured a total of three times in the "Gekisha" series of gravure photos in the competing magazine "GORO." The photographer was Kishin Shinoyama. After the "GORO" feature, she completely withdrew from gravure modeling.

On April 1, 2024, the fifth installment of the photobook series "Memories of Apples," titled "NAMI ASADA 5: Nami Asada Photobook 'Memories of Apples' 5 Final Cut (NAMI ASADA 5 麻田奈美写真集「林檎の記憶」5 ファイナルカット)," was released by Shogakukan. The photobook also includes recent photographs of Asada, who turned 65 in April 2019. At the same time, Aspect re-released volumes 1–4 of "Ringo no Kioku" ( 林檎の記憶; Memories of Apples), which were previously released, as digital photobooks.

== Photo works ==
- Heibon Punch Special Issue: Nami Asada's Records of Youth (June 10, 1977, Heibon Publishing, Photography: Yoichi Aoyagi)
- APPLE 1972–1977 Nami Asada Photobook (March 2000, Aspect, Photography: Yoichi Aoyagi) ISBN 978-4757207202
- APPLE 2 Nami Asada Photobook (March 2001, Aspect, Photography: Yoichi Aoyagi) ISBN 978-4757208278
- Ringo ANOTHER APPLE: Nami Asada Photobook (October 2004, Kodansha, Photography: Yoichi Aoyagi) ISBN 978-4061723481
- The final Nami Asada photobook (September 28, 2011, Magazine House, Photography: Yoichi Aoyagi) ISBN 9784838723195
- Nami Asada Photobook "Memories of Apples" Vol. 1 "Studio Test" (September 25, 2014, Aspect, Photography: Yoichi Aoyagi) ISBN 978-4757223769
- Nami Asada Photobook "Memories of Apples" 2 "Apples and Lemons" (December 24, 2014, Aspect, Photography: Yoichi Aoyagi) ISBN 978-4757223776
- Nami Asada Photobook "Memories of Apples" 3 "Hot Spring Trip" (April 24, 2015, Aspect, Photography: Yoichi Aoyagi) ISBN 978-4757223783
- Nami Asada Photobook "Memories of Apples" 4 "Overseas Travel" (January 12, 2016, Aspect, Photography: Yoichi Aoyagi) ISBN 978-4757224261
- Nami Asada Photobook "Memories of Apples" 5 "Final Cut" (April 1, 2024, Shogakukan, Photography: Yoichi Aoyagi) ISBN 978-4096824504

== Musical career ==
=== Single ===
Release date	Format	Standard part number	Side	Title	Lyrics	Composer	Arranger
Nippon Columbia
November 1973	EP	P-320	A	Osoi natsu (おそい夏)	Haruo Hayashi	Makoto Kawaguchi	
November 1973	EP	P-320	B	Cattleya no hana (カトレアの花)	Haruo Hayashi	Makoto Kawaguchi	

=== Compilation albums ===
The dankai punch series, co-produced by Victor Entertainment with dankai punch magazine, uses her Apple Nude photo on all three covers.

Release date	Title	Label	Catalog no.	Notes
November 21, 2007	dankai punch ~Tokyo ni Kaze ga Fuku~ Showa 40年代 フォーク (Folk)	Victor Entertainment	VICL-62653	
January 23, 2008	dankai punch ~Tokyo ni Kaze ga Fuku~ Showa 40年代 歌謡曲 (Kayōkyoku)	Victor Entertainment	VICL-62737	
March 19, 2008	dankai punch ~Tokyo ni Kaze ga Fuku~ Showa 40年代 ポップス (Pops)	Victor Entertainment	VICL-62767	Includes "Osoi Natsu" (おそい夏) as a bonus track.

Her debut single also appears on these Nippon Columbia compilations:

Release date	Title	Label	Catalog no.	Notes
December 12, 2000	魅惑のムード 秘宝館	Nippon Columbia	GSD-6901	Includes "Osoi Natsu".
May 24, 2017	Nippon Columbia Girls Legend: First Generation (1972–1979) (コロムビア・ガールズ伝説)	Nippon Columbia	COCP-39964/65	Includes "Osoi Natsu" and "Cattleya no Hana".
July 25, 2018	泥んこのメルヘン 〜女たちの挽歌II〜	Nippon Columbia	COCP-40468	Includes "Osoi Natsu" and "Cattleya no Hana".
