= Gary Namie =

American psychologist

- Education: Washington & Jefferson College (AB); San Francisco State University (MA); University of California, Santa Barbara (PhD)
- Occupation: Advocate
- Known for: Co-founder and Director of the Workplace Bullying Institute
- Scientific career
- Fields: Social psychology Organizational psychology

Gary Namie is an American social psychologist and anti-workplace bullying activist. Dr. Namie is widely regarded as North America's foremost authority on the topic of workplace bullying.

== Education ==
Namie has an AB from Washington & Jefferson College in Washington, Pennsylvania, and an MA in Research Psychology from San Francisco State University and a PhD in social psychology from the University of California, Santa Barbara in 1982.

In 1982, Namie won both the Early Career Teaching Award from the American Psychological Association and the Campus Teaching Award from University of California, Santa Barbara.

== Career ==
Namie taught psychology and management at US colleges for two decades. He was also served as a corporate manager for two regional hospital systems.

In 1997, after his wife Ruth (who has a doctorate in clinical psychology herself) was subject to harassment by her employer, the Namies launched the Workplace Bullying Institute (WBI), a national campaign against workplace bullying. Namie created the Respectful Conduct Clinic, a program designed to rehabilitate perpetrators of abusive bullying in the workplace, and he created and delivered the first U.S. college course on workplace bullying at Western Washington University.

In 2003, Namie began lobbying for the Healthy Workplace Bill, authored by Employment Law professor David C. Yamada of Suffolk University, which has been introduced in 31 states. Namie continues to serve as the National Director for the bill. In 2005, Namie was the expert witness in the nation's first "bullying trial" in Indiana with the verdict upheld by the state Supreme Court. A jury award of $325,000 was sustained. The precedent-setting statement from the Supreme Court opinion:

The phrase ‘workplace bullying,’ like other general terms used to characterize a person’s behavior, is an entirely appropriate consideration…workplace bullying could be considered a form of intentional infliction of emotional distress.

Starting in 2007, the Workplace Bullying Institute has commissioned Zogby Analytics to conduct the representative surveys of all adult Americans on the topic of workplace bullying. The 2021 survey reports that 30% of American workers have experienced workplace bullying. In 2008, Namie created Workplace Bullying University®, a comprehensive training for professionals.

In 2014, Namie was retained by celebrity and sports attorney Wm. David Cornwell to serve as expert witness in a bullying scandal involving Jonathan Martin and the Miami Dolphins.

In 2015, Namie and Yamada founded the U.S. Academy of Workplace Bullying, Mobbing and Abuse to “focus on the unique challenges posed by American employee relations, mental health, and legal systems.”

In 2021, Namie created SafeHarbor, the first online community dedicated to people affected by workplace bullying and those devoted to helping them.

== Publications ==
- Namie, Gary; Namie, Ruth (1999). BullyProof yourself at work! : personal strategies to stop the hurt from harassment. Benicia, Calif.: DoubleDoc Press. ISBN 0-9668629-5-3. OCLC 41134271.
- Namie, Gary; Namie, Ruth (2000). The bully at work : what you can do to stop the hurt and reclaim your dignity on the job. Naperville, IL: Sourcebooks. ISBN 1-57071-534-3. OCLC 43385335.
- Namie, Gary; Namie, Ruth (September 2009). "U.S. Workplace bullying: Some basic considerations and consultation interventions". Consulting Psychology Journal: Practice and Research. 61 (3): 202–219. doi:10.1037/a0016670.
- Namie, Gary; Lutgen-Sandvik, Pamela E. (19 March 2010). "Active and Passive Accomplices: The Communal Character of Workplace Bullying". International Journal of Communication. 4: 31.
- Namie, Gary; Namie, Ruth (2011). The bully-free workplace : stop jerks, weasels, and snakes from killing your organization. Hoboken, NJ: Wiley. ISBN 978-1-118-06724-6. OCLC 757516377.
- Namie, Gary; Namie, Ruth; Lutgen-Sandvik, Pamela (2010-09-22). "Challenging Workplace Bullying in the United States". Bullying and Harassment in the Workplace. CRC Press. pp. 447–467. doi:10.1201/ebk1439804896-25 (inactive 12 July 2025). ISBN 978-1-4398-0489-6.
- Duffy, Maureen P.; Yamada, David C. (2018). Workplace bullying and mobbing in the United States. Santa Barbara, California. ISBN 978-1-4408-5023-3. OCLC 987796655.
