= Ruth F. Namie =

American psychologist

Ruth Florence Namie is an American psychologist known for raising awareness of workplace bullying. Along with her husband, Gary Namie, she founded the Workplace Bullying Institute in 1997. Since the late 1990s, Ruth and Gary Namie have educated the public about workplace bullying, forming the Campaign Against Workplace Bullying, launching the "Bullybusters" website in January 1998, and organizing and hosting "Workplace Bullying 2000," the first United States-based conference on workplace bullying.

== Education ==
Namie received a Ph.D. in Clinical Psychology from the California School of Professional Psychology in 1993. Her dissertation was titled "Antecedent familial factors and extent of adult alcoholism."

== Career ==
Namie and her husband founded the Workplace Bullying Institute in 1997. The Workplace Bullying Institute strives to prevent and correct abusive conduct at work through support and research. Namie assists in the development and consulting of the programs for Workplace Bullying Institute. In recent years, she has decreased her responsibilities at the Institute due to her health. Her WBI Workplace Bullying University courses are the only comprehensive training program for professionals in the world.

The Namies' efforts to educate the public about workplace bullying have been noted by legal scholars. According to David C. Yamada, a Professor of Law and the Director of the New Workplace Institute at Suffolk University, the Namies "would bring workplace bullying into the vocabulary of American employment relations...They decided that an American campaign of research and education was necessary to expose this widespread for of common mistreatment at work, and they chose to use the term bullying because they believed it would resonate with the public."

Ruth and Gary Namie have been influential in legal efforts to recognize the deleterious impact of workplace bullying. The Namies introduced the Healthy Workplace Bill to state legislators in California. In 2003, the California Assembly was the first legislative body in the United States to consider workplace bullying legislation. As of November 2022, 31 states have introduced legislation to support anti-bullying in the workplace. Only Puerto Rico, however, has passed the Healthy Workplace Bill.

Before focusing on workplace bullying, Namie worked as a training director for Sheraton Hotels in Hawaii. After graduate school, Namie worked at a health maintenance organization in California, where she specialized in chemical dependency treatment. While working at the health maintenance organization, Namie experienced workplace bullying from her supervisor. This experience resulted in post-traumatic stress disorder (PTSD). It also compelled Namie to the career change that led to founding the Workplace Bullying Institute.

== Research and institutional impact ==
In 2018, Namie co-authored a book chapter titled "Risk Factors for Becoming a Target of Workplace Bullying and Mobbing" with Gary Namie. Published in the collection Workplace Bullying and Mobbing in the United States (edited by Maureen Duffy and David C. Yamada), the chapter examines target selection in workplace aggression. The authors categorize why an individual is targeted into three core components: dispositional personality traits, behaviors that trigger hostility, and perpetrator characteristics that interact with a worker's actions. Additionally, the chapter distinguishes between initial target selection and secondary emotional consequences, noting that post-bullying emotional responses serve as predictors of impact severity rather than primary causes of targeting. Their framework has been cited across multiple organizational and cross-cultural studies. For example, Williams (2023) incorporated their model to analyze the relationship between workplace harassment and employee burnout in higher education. In international research, Bencsik and colleagues (2024) utilized their target selection criteria to examine psychological harassment dynamics in Hungary and Slovakia, while Polistina (2022) applied their findings to evaluate organizational behavior barriers.

Legal scholars and policy analysts have referenced empirical data from the Workplace Bullying Institute (WBI), co-founded by Ruth Namie, to analyze workplace gender dynamics. In a 2023 analysis published in the FIU Law Review, legal scholar David C. Yamada cited WBI’s national surveys (conducted with Zogby Analytics) to establish four key principles regarding women and workplace mistreatment. Drawing on WBI data, the study highlighted that women are disproportionately targeted by workplace bullying, examined the prevalence of male perpetrators, and evaluated how anti-bullying legislation could address toxic work environments and gender bias.

Legal scholar David C. Yamada noted that Gary and Ruth Namie introduced the term "workplace bullying" into the vocabulary of American employment relations. Synthesizing earlier European research on workplace mobbing by Heinz Leymann and Andrea Adams, the Namies selected the term "bullying" specifically to resonate with the American public.

Ruth Namie's frameworks have been referenced and integrated into academic and policy discourse. For example, in a journal published by the Ohio State University Moritz College of Law, legal scholar Dan Calvin referenced the Workplace Bullying Institute's core framework and cited Gary and Ruth Namie's Bullyproof Yourself at Work! to analyze proposed statutory protections and workplace conduct standards. Similarly, the University of Wisconsin–Madison referenced the Workplace Bullying Institute's research in its 2014 institutional resource guide, Preventing and Eradicating Bullying: Resource Guide and Talking Points for Leaders and Change Champions.

== Selected publications ==
- Bully Proof Yourself At Work: Personal Strategies to Recognize and Stop the Hurt from Harassment (1999)
- The Bully at Work: What Your Can Do to Stop the Hurt and Reclaim Your Dignity on the Job (2000)
- The Bully-Free Workplace: Stop Jerks, Weasels, and Snakes From Killing Your Organization (2013)

== Personal life ==
Ruth Namie and her husband, Gary, married in 1983.
