= Yusif Qarabaghi =

Turkic scientist

- Born: 1532; Qarabagh, Safavid Empire
- Died: 1591 (according to some sources, in the 17th century); Shaybanids
- Occupation(s): Doctor, philosopher and poet

Yusif Qarabaghi (b. 1532; Qarabagh, Safavid Empire - d. 1591; Samarkand, Shaybanids) was a Turkic scientist, doctor, and philosopher.

== Life ==
He was born in Karabakh and received his first education there. He belonged to the Turkoman nomadic Otuziki tribe, from the Muhammadshahlu clan. Later, he took lessons from Habibullah Mirzacan Shirazi. After finishing his education, he moved to Central Asia with his teacher. Yusif Karabakhi lived in Samarkand and Bukhara, and received the title of Great Akhund for his work there. He belonged to the Kubrawiyya sect, a sect founded by the famous Sufi sheikh Najmuddin Kubra.

== Activity ==
Among the manuscripts stored in the Institute of Oriental Studies of Uzbekistan, 20 works were written by Yusif Karabakhi. The language of most of these works is Arabic. Some of them are written in Turkish. Turkish scientist Abdürrahim Gozel named seven of his works whose manuscripts are kept in the Suleymaniye library. Although it is mentioned in the sources that he had poetic works as well as scientific and philosophical works, they have not been found yet. "Heft Jinan" ("Seven Gardens"), written by Yusif Karabakhi in Persian, was translated and published into Azerbaijani by Orientalist scholar Masiagha Mohammadi. One of his works is stored in the library in Saint Petersburg.

== Sources ==
- Raqim, Xacə Seyid Şərif (2016). Tarix-e Raqimi. AMEA Şərqşünaslıq İnistitutu.
- Бакиханов, Аббас-Кули-ага (1983). Сочинения, записки, письма. Elm.
- Araslı, Həmid (1956). Azərbaycan XVII=XVIII əsr Azərbaycan ədəbiyyatı tarixi. BSU.
- Tərbiyət, Məhəmmədəli (1987). Danişməndani-Azərbaycan.
- Güzel, Abdürrahim (1991). Karabaği ve Tehafütü.
- Çingizoğlu, Ənvər (2010). Yusif Qarabaği. Soy.
- Qarabaği, Yusif (1997). Yeddi bağ. İrşad.
