= Allergy (journal) =

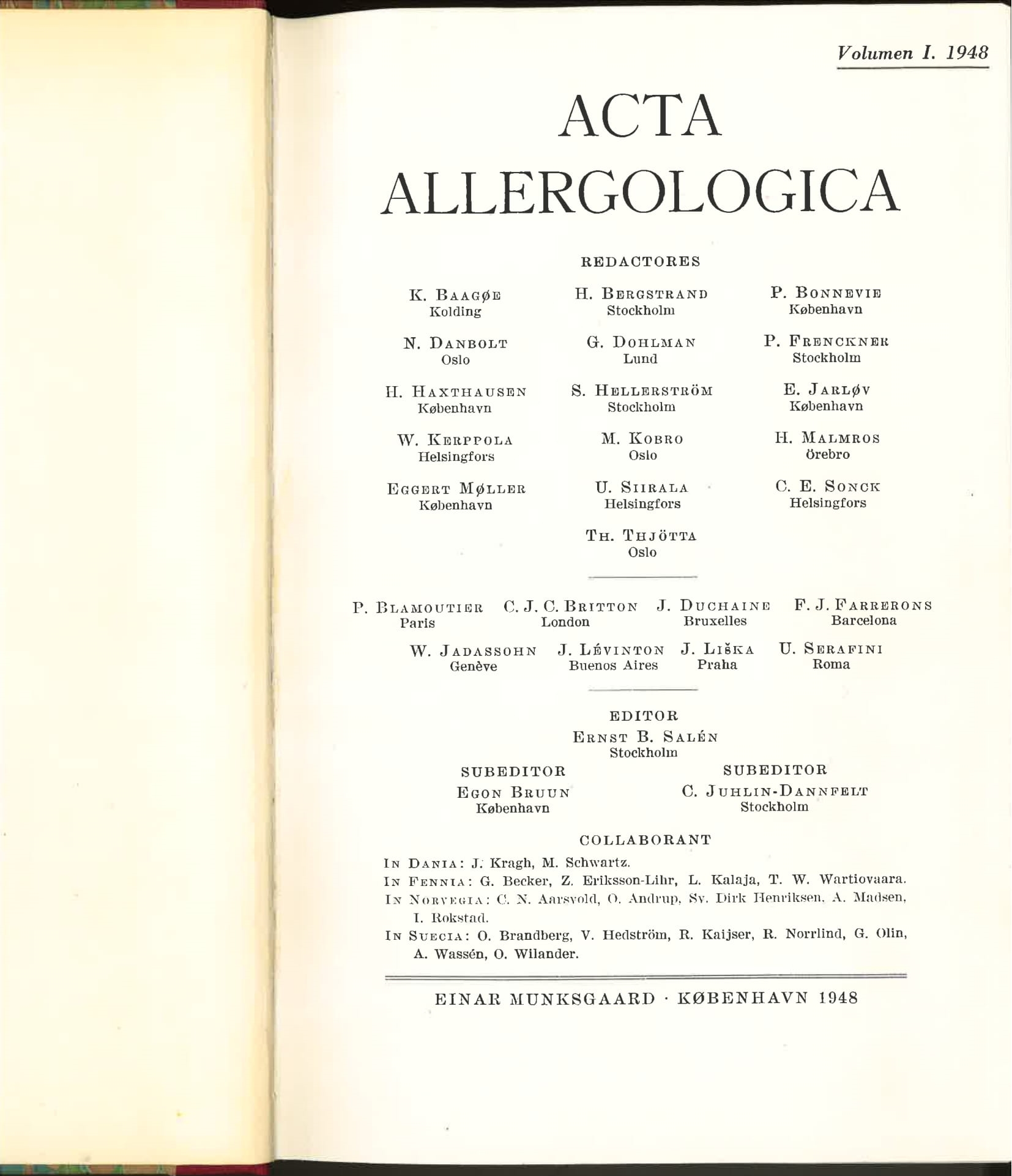
- Discipline: Allergy, immunology
- Language: English
- Edited by: Cezmi Akdis

Publication details
- Former name: Acta Allergologica
- History: 1948–present
- Publisher: Wiley
- Frequency: Monthly
- Impact factor: 11.3 (2025)

Standard abbreviations
- ISO 4: Allergy

Indexing
- CODEN: LLRGDY
- ISSN: 0105-4538 (print); 1398-9995 (web)
- OCLC no.: 03831322

Links
- Journal homepage; Online access; Online archive

Allergy is a monthly peer-reviewed medical journal covering the field of allergy and immunology, that is published by Wiley on behalf of the European Academy of Allergology and Clinical Immunology. It publishes both original articles and reviews. The editor-in-chief is Cezmi Akdis (University of Zurich). According to the Journal Citation Reports, the journal has a 2025 impact factor of 11.3.

== History ==
The journal' was established by Ernst B. Salén as Acta Allergologica and was first published by Einer Munksgard in 1948. Salén was also the original editor-in-chief, however, Egon Bruun also helped in the early years. Other editors-in-chief have been Gunnar Bendixen (1970–1992), Gunnar S. Johansson (1993–2002), Jean Bousquet (2003–2009), Thomas Bieber and Hans-Uwe Simon (2010–2017), and the current editor-in-chief Cezmi Akdis (March 2018–present).
