= C. Emre Koksal =

Turkish electrical engineer and scientist

Can Emre Koksal
- Occupations: Electrical engineer, computer scientist, academic, and entrepreneur
- Awards: Columbus Business First, Inventor of the Year; CAREER Award, National Science Foundation (NSF)

Academic background
- Education: Middle East Technical University (BS); Massachusetts Institute of Technology (MS, PhD)
- Thesis: Providing Quality of Service over High Speed Switches and Optical Networks (2002)
- Academic advisor: Robert G. Gallager

Can Emre Koksal is an electrical engineer, computer scientist, academic, and entrepreneur. He is the Founder and CEO of Datanchor, and a professor of Electrical and Computer Engineering at Ohio State University.

Koksal is best known for his research on wireless communication, information security, communication networks, and information theory. He is the author of more than 150 academic papers and the inventor in 8 patents. He is the recipient of several awards for his inventions. He has been an Associate Editor for IEEE Transactions on Information Theory, IEEE Transactions on Wireless Communications, and Elsevier Computer Networks.

== Education ==
Koksal received his bachelor's degree in Electrical Engineering from Middle East Technical University in 1996. He then emigrated to the United States, earning his Master's and Doctoral degrees in Electrical Engineering and Computer Science from Massachusetts Institute of Technology in 1998 and 2002, respectively. His dissertation, Providing Quality of Service over High Speed Switches and Optical Networks, was supervised by Robert G. Gallager.

== Career ==
Koksal has internship positions at ASELSAN Military Electronics and Tellabs. He was an engineer at Sycamore Networks. Academically, he was affiliated with MIT Lincoln Lab. until 1998, Lab for Information and Decision Systems until 2003, and Computer Science and Artificial Intelligence Labs until 2004. From 2004 to 2006, he held appointment as a Senior Researcher in the School of Computer and Communication Sciences at EPFL. In 2006, Koksal joined the Ohio State University as an assistant professor of Electrical and Computer Engineering. He was promoted to associate professor in 2013, and became Professor in 2017.

Koksal is the Founder and CEO of Datanchor.

== Research ==
Koksal has focused his research on information security, communication networks, wireless communication, and information theory.

=== Data security ===
In the latter part of his career, Koksal has focused on securing data. He has combined data encryption with physical contextual access control. Earlier in such efforts he has made data access controlled via sound waves using a high data-rate acoustic modem he has built. Later on, he has generalized the ideas to enable data to protect itself as protection is directly integrated into files and database queries. He developed a wireless communication system with applications to achieve constant bit rate data transmission over a block fading channel, securely from an eavesdropper. His research indicated that the optimal power control involves a time sharing between secure water filling and channel inversion strategies. In 2017, he studied the ways to optimally manage the freshness of information updates sent from a source node to a destination via a channel. With an intention to secure massive MIMO at the physical layer, he introduced n beamforming strategy that establishes information theoretic security without need to Wyner encoding.

=== Network switches ===
Koksal's earlier research interests revolved around optical and electronic switches and building efficient algorithms that would eliminate the inefficiencies associated with the flow of data due to constraints associated with switching fabrics. He has shown that complexities can be eliminated and at the same time full throughput can be achieved by a variety of multistage switch architectures in optical and electronic networks.

=== Wireless communication ===
Later, Koksal has investigated problems at the intersection of wireless communication and networking. In the early stages of wireless networks, he has built wireless-channel-aware network algorithms for wireless sensor networks and mesh networks. He has also derived the outage capacity of wireless channels and networks under energy-harvesting power sources.

=== Wireless security ===
Koksal has also focused on problems around securing wireless networks at the physical layer. He has applied information-theoretic ideas for information secrecy for large-scale wireless networks. These efforts lead to a better understanding of the scaling of secrecy capacity of wireless networks and how to implement such wireless networks with secrecy constraints. He has applied his ideas in securing vehicular communications via physical-layer mechanisms.

== Awards and honors ==
- 2011 - CAREER Award, National Science Foundation (NSF)
- 2011, 2017 - Lumley Research Award, OSU College of Engineering
- 2011 - IRP Award, HP Labs
- 2016, 2019 - Innovators Award, OSU College of Engineering
- 2016 - Third Prize, IEEE VNC Mobile App Design Contest
- 2018 - Best Paper, IEEE WiOpt
- 2019 - Inventor of the Year, Columbus Business
- 2020 - Tech Innovation Award, CRN Magazine

== Bibliography ==
- Koksal, C. E., Kassab, H., & Balakrishnan, H. (2000, June). An analysis of short-term fairness in wireless media access protocols. In Proceedings of the 2000 ACM SIGMETRICS international conference on Measurement and modeling of computer systems (pp. 118–119).
- Miu, A., Balakrishnan, H., & Koksal, C. E. (2005, August). Improving loss resilience with multi-radio diversity in wireless networks. In Proceedings of the 11th annual international conference on Mobile computing and networking (pp. 16–30).
- Koksal, C. E., & Balakrishnan, H. (2006). Quality-aware routing metrics for time-varying wireless mesh networks. IEEE Journal on selected areas in communications, 24(11), 1984–1994.
- Koyluoglu, O. O., Koksal, C. E., & El Gamal, H. (2012). On secrecy capacity scaling in wireless networks. IEEE Transactions on Information Theory, 58(5), 3000–3015.
- Sun, Y., Uysal-Biyikoglu, E., Yates, R. D., Koksal, C. E., & Shroff, N. B. (2017). Update or wait: How to keep your data fresh. IEEE Transactions on Information Theory, 63(11), 7492–7508.
