= Ahi Çelebi =

Ottoman physician

Ahi Çelebi (1432–1522) was an Ottoman physician in the 15th and early 16th centuries. His name was Mahmut, but he was better known as Ahi Çelebi. Ahi refers to Ahi Evren, who founded the fraternity civil organization of the artisans in the 13th century and Çelebi was an honorific title.

== Biography ==
He was born in 1432. His father Kemaleddin was a physician in Kastamonu, then the capital of Candaroğlu Beylik, a beylik (principality) in northwest Anatolia. Ahi was trained by his father. In 1461 the beylik was annexed by Mehmet II of the Ottoman Empire. Kemaleddin and Ahi moved to Istanbul to continue practice. In Istanbul following the death of his father, Ahi collaborated with Altunizade and Kudbüttin, two famous physicians of the time. He gained a reputation as an able doctor and the sultan Bayezit II (r.1481–1512) appointed him to the chief doctor post of the palace.

After the abdication of Beyazıt in 1512, he resigned as the custom dictated. But Selim I (1512–1520), the new sultan, reappointed him to his former post where he continued to the end of Selim's reign. After Selim's death he resigned and went to hajj (pilgrim) in 1522. During his return voyage, he died in Cairo (now in Egypt) and was laid to rest in the mosque of al-Shafi'i.

== Legacy ==
Ahi Çelebi died a very wealthy man. He had about 40 villages in Rumelia, markets and a hamam in Istanbul. He endowed most of his wealth to build a madrasa in Edirne and a mosque in Istanbul.

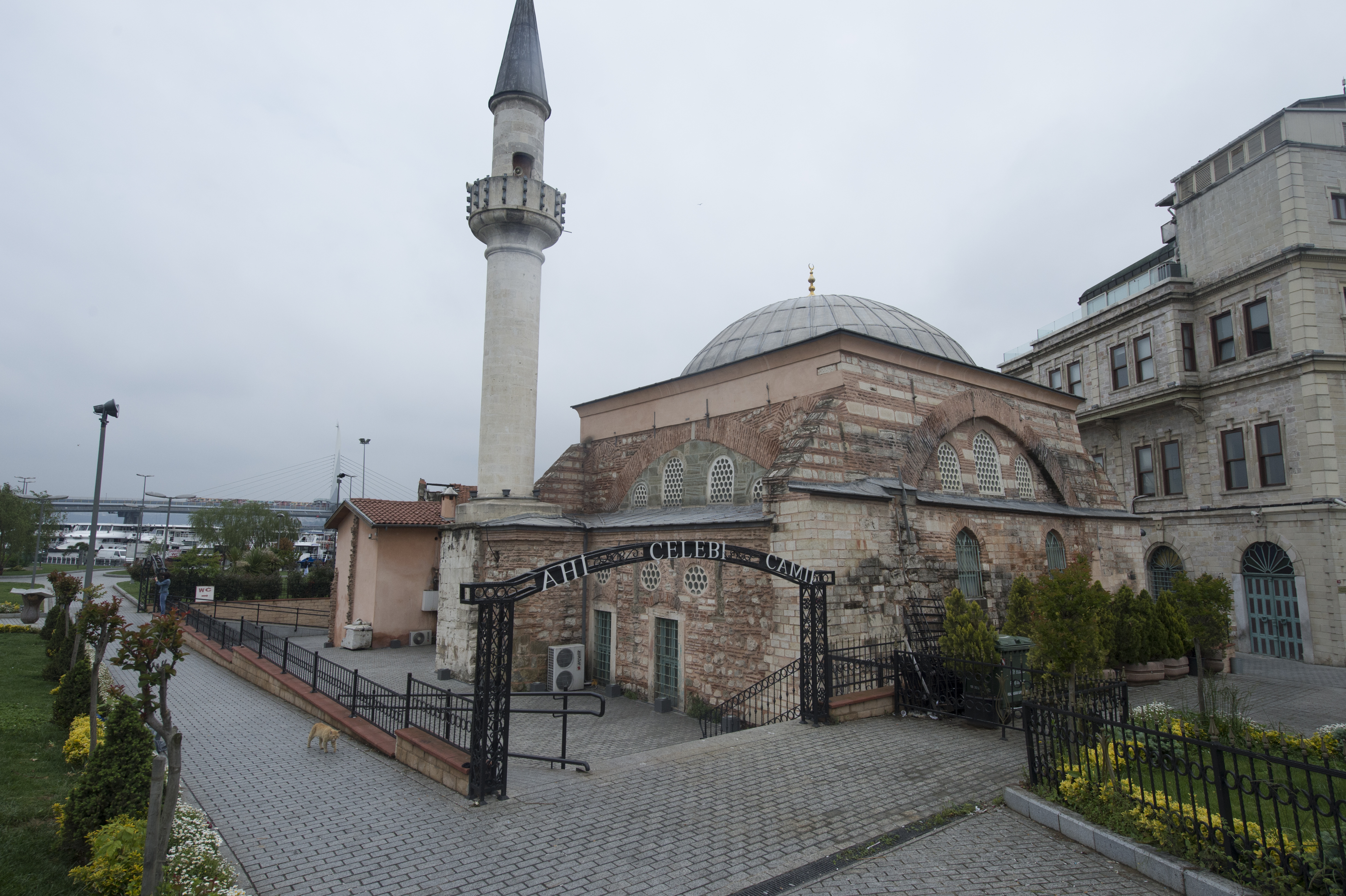
Ahi Celebi Mosque in Istanbul exterior

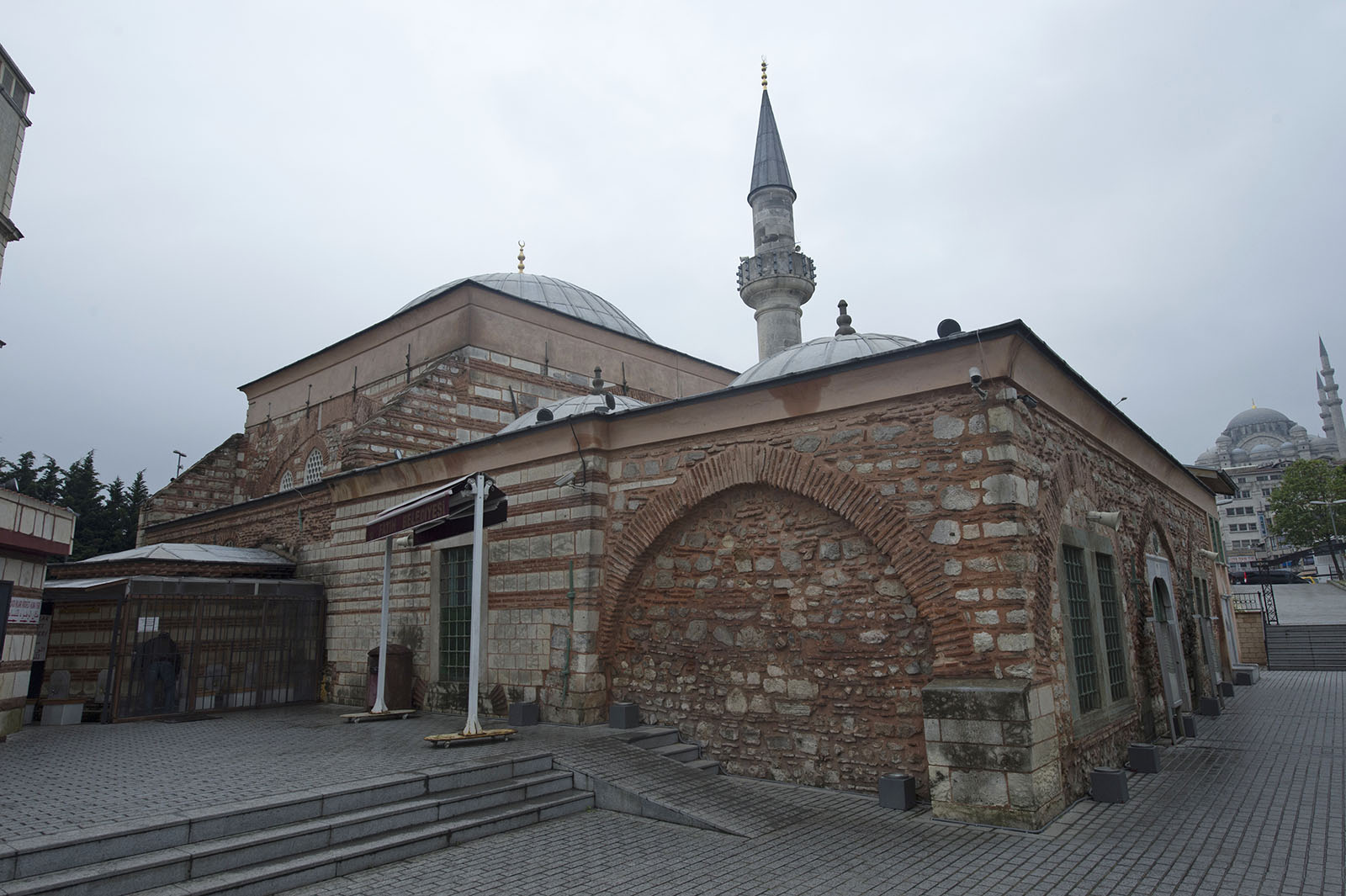
Ahi Celebi Mosque in Istanbul exterior

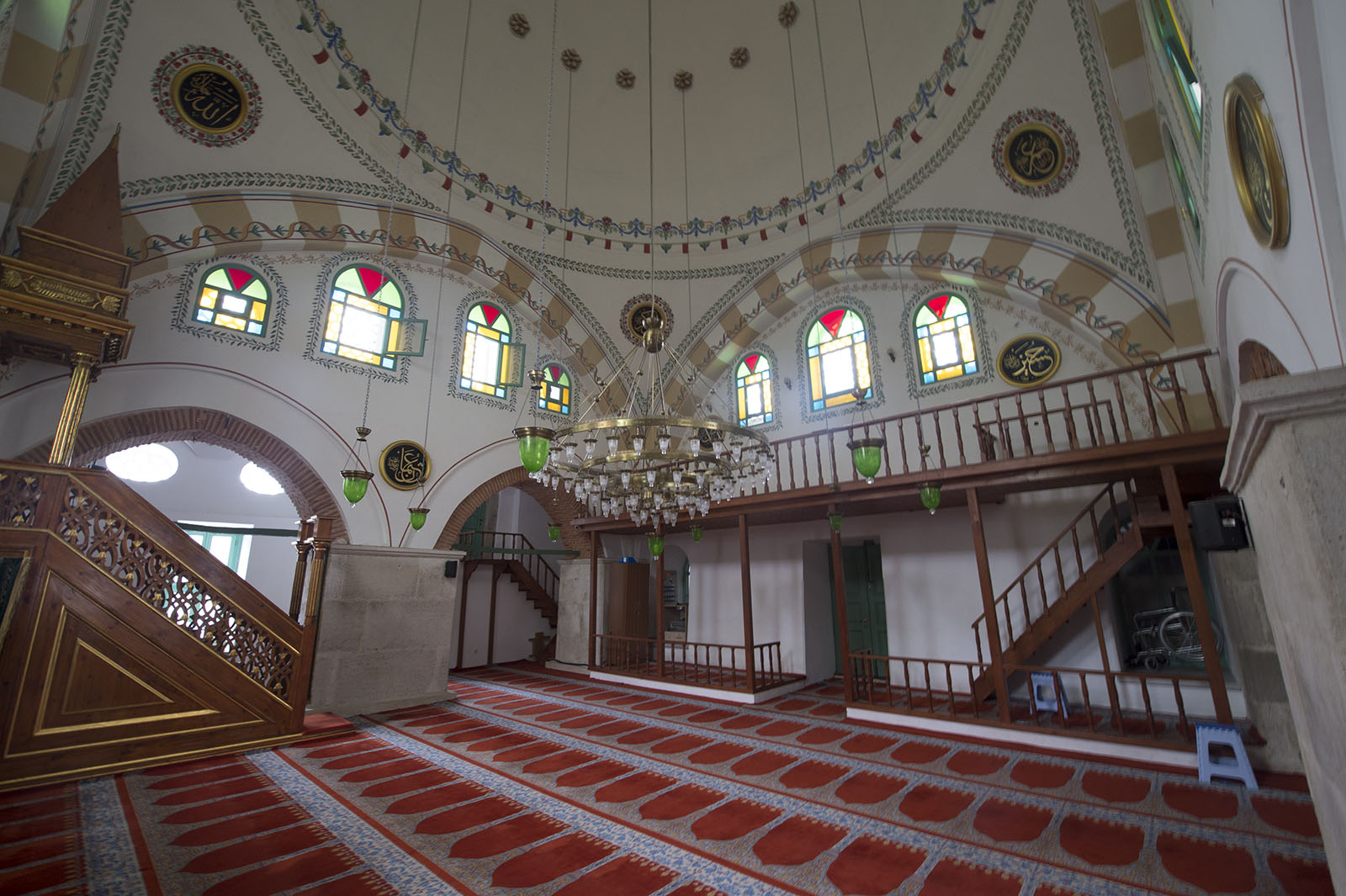
Ahi Celebi Mosque in Istanbul interior
