= İbrahim Adnan Saraçoğlu =

İbrahim Adnan Saraçoğlu (1949, Mersin) is a Turkish chemistry professor, biochemist, microbiologist and researcher.

After his chemistry studies, he completed his PhD studies at the Karl-Franzens University and became an assistant at the Institute for Molecular Biosciences. Between 1985 and 1986, he worked at the Çukurova University and made his doctorate in 1987. In 1994, he became a professor.

He was a lecturer at the Karl-Franzens University and also was researcher/academic manager at the Institute for Physics and Biomedical Sensors of the AVL List.

Saraçoğlu worked at the Vienna Technical University as a professor. He is the author of a number of articles in international scientific publications and owns a number of patents. Currently, he continues his research on botany and the influence of plants on human health focusing on the field of phytho-biochemistry.

Through his research, he concluded the healing effect of broccoli against prostatitis and benign prostata enlargement and the healing effect of lavender against hepatitis B and hepatitis C. He was the first to coin the term of "Preventive Vegetal Therapy" and built/stated its principles.
