= Oruç Güvenç =

Turkish Sufi master and musician

Rahmi Oruç Güvenç (1948 - July 5, 2017) was a Turkish Sufi master, musician, music therapist, ethnomusicologist and a poet. Widely considered as one of the most influential figures in Turkish music, Güvenç authored many classical Turkish and Sufi compositions.

== Biography ==
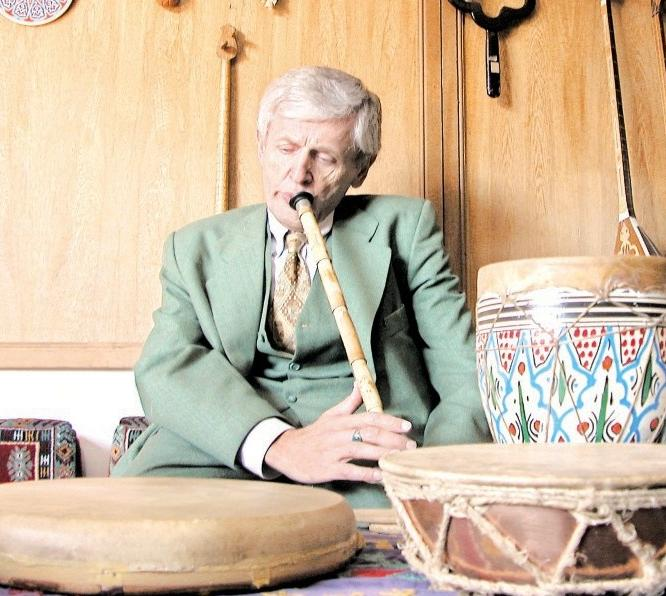
Oruç Güvenç while playing the ney.

Güvenç was born in 1948 in Tavşanlı district of Kütahya. He was the second child of Ahmet Kamil Güvenç and Urkiye Güvenç.

After completing his high school education at Kütahya High School, Güvenç studied philosophy and graduated from Istanbul University.

Güvenç started his music life by taking violin lessons from Fethi Bey while he was in secondary school. During his university years he learned to play oud, rebab, ney and drum. In 1975, he founded TÜMATA, an organisation to study and promote Turkish music. Güvenç taught at Istanbul University and, from 1991 to 1996, served as the head of the university's Music Ethnology, Research and Music Therapy department. He was awarded an honorary professorship by Fergana University in 1992. In the same year, he was also honoured by the Argentine Academia de las Naciones.

Oruç Güvenç died on 5 July 2017 in İstanbul. He was buried in Karacaahmet Cemetery.

== Works ==
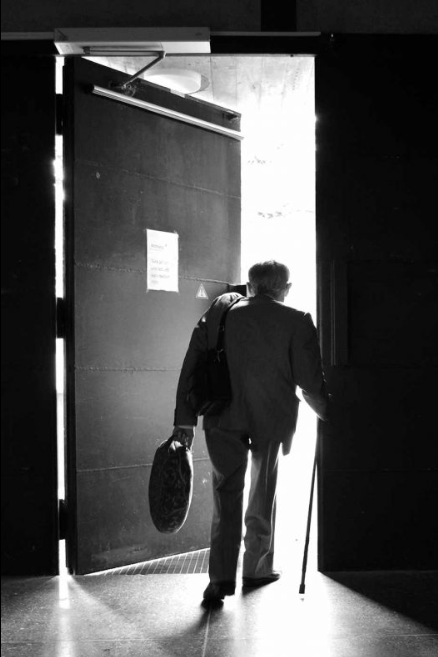
Oruç Güvenç leaving..

Oruç Güvenç authored two books and many compositions.

=== Albums ===
- Ocean of Remembrance (1995)
- Rivers of One (1997)

=== Books ===
- Music Therapy: Hüseyin Makam
- The Beloved of Allah - Hazret Mevlana

=== Workshops and Seminars ===
Rahmi Oruç Güvenç conducted workshops and seminars on the tradition of Turkish Music and Movement Therapy and Turkish Islamic Sufism. He delivered these seminars in various countries, primarily in Turkiye, Austria, Germany, Spain, Switzerland. Some of his lectures in Turkish are recorded. These recordings are published as a podcast and as transcriptions on a dedicated website.
