= Nami Kartal =

Turkish wood scientist and professor

Saip Nami Kartal
- Born: 18 April 1969 (age 57); Düzce, Turkey
- Awards: Fellow at IAWS
- Scientific career
- Fields: Wood science
- Workplaces: Istanbul University–Cerrahpaşa

Saip Nami Kartal (born 1969) is a Turkish wood scientist and professor at the Istanbul University-Cerrahpaşa in Turkey, who is an elected fellow (FIAWS) of the International Academy of Wood Science.

== Early life ==
Kartal was born in Düzce, Turkey, on 18 April 1969, and lived in his hometown before enrolling at Istanbul University. He completed his BSc in forest industrial engineering, graduating with honors in 1990, and earned a PhD degree in wood protection from Istanbul University in 1999.

== Research career ==
Kartal conducted postdoctoral research at the USDA Forest Products Laboratory in Madison, USA (1999–2001), followed by a JSPS funded fellowship at the Kyoto University in the years 2002–2004. He returned to Istanbul University-Cerrahpaşa in Turkey, progressing to full professor and spearheading the Department of Forest Biology and Wood Protection Technology. He has collaborated with institutions worldwide, including University of Hamburg, Beijing Forestry University, Aalto University, Virginia Tech, and Kyoto University in the area of wood biology.

In 2022–2023, he was affiliated with the University of the Sunshine Coast in Australia, where he held the position of adjunct professor at the university's Faculty of Science, Health, Education and Engineering, being associated with the National Centre for Timber Durability and Design Life.

Kartal has published over 140 peer-reviewed articles in topics such as wood nanomaterial preservation, termite and fungal decay resistance of wood, and boron-based wood treatment. He additionally carried out research work on the contact charring and wood preservation technique originating from Japan, the Yakisugi.

In 2013, the International Academy of Wood Science, elected Kartal as a fellow, for his research and scientific work. In 2023, a meta-research carried out by John Ioannidis et al. at Stanford University included Kartal in Elsevier Data 2022, where he was ranked in the top 2% of researchers in wood science (forestry – biotechnology). In August 2024, Nami Kartal acquired the same global rating for his research and scientific work in wood science (Elsevier Data 2023), and also in August 2025.

Until November 2025, the research work of N. Kartal has received 4,300 citations at Google Scholar (h-index: 37).

== Selected publications ==
- SN Kartal, F Green Iii, CA Clausen (2009). Do the unique properties of nanometals affect leachability or efficacy against fungi and termites?
- CA Clausen, F Green III, S Nami Kartal (2010). Weatherability and leach resistance of wood impregnated with nano-zinc oxide
- G Mantanis, E Terzi, SN Kartal, AN Papadopoulos (2014). Evaluation of mold, decay and termite resistance of pine wood treated with zinc-and copper-based nanocompounds
