= Oruç Aruoba =

Turkish writer, poet, and philosopher (1948–2020)

Oruç Aruoba (14 July 1948 – 31 May 2020), was a Turkish Abkhaz writer, poet, and philosopher.

His research subjects were epistemology. Ethics and the philosophers he was influenced by were Kant, Kierkegaard, Nietzsche, Marx, Heidegger and Wittgenstein. His work mostly takes the form of poetry, arguing that the human's connection with the world is only made possible through poetic language.
