= Swiss Institute of Allergy and Asthma Research =

Swiss research institute

The Swiss Institute of Allergy and Asthma Research (SIAF) was founded in 1988 as an institution of the foundation Schweizerisches Forschungsinstitut für Hochgebirgsklima und Medizin SFI in Davos, Switzerland. SIAF is located at the Medicine Campus Davos, which opened in 2019. SIAF has been an affiliated institute of the University of Zurich since 1995.

The first director of SIAF was professor Kurt Blaser. Professor Dr. Cezmi A. Akdis has been the director since 2007. As of 2018, he holds the position of Editor-in-Chief of the journal Allergy within SIAF. He is included in the group of 1,000 most cited researchers from all scientific disciplines worldwide by Thomson Reuters for the fifth consecutive year.

In 2007, SIAF became a member of the Life Science Zurich Graduate School, a joint postgraduate education program of the ETH Zurich (Swiss Federal Institute of Technology) and the University of Zurich. SIAF is an active member of Academia Raetica, the network of scientific institutions in the Canton of Grisons.

SIAF is located at the Medicine Campus Davos, which opened in 2019. The new campus building in Davos Wolfgang has 3’136 square meters of laboratory and office space. The facility is with modern laboratories and equipment, including a biosafety level 3 laboratory.

== Research ==
SIAF is a member in national and international organizations, such as the European Academy of Allergy and Clinical Immunology (EAACI). SIAF scientists are involved in editorial boards and editorships of notable scientific journals in the field of allergies, asthma, and clinical immunology. SIAF scientists fulfill teaching obligations at the University of Zurich and the University of Salzburg. SIAF organizes the yearly international World Immune Regulation Meeting (WIRM).

SIAF focuses on direct patient-relevant human immunology and cell biology with a series of research projects on immune regulatory aspects and particularly allergen tolerance, regulation of tissue cells and tissue barriers, methods for the detection of tissue barriers, regulatory aspects of noncoding DNA, and development of vaccines.

== See also ==
- Science and technology in Switzerland
