= Józef Wierusz-Kowalski =

Polish physicist and diplomat (1866–1927)

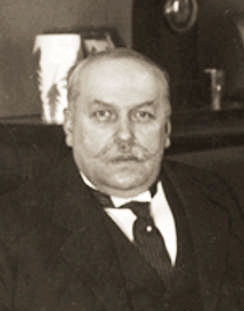
- Born: 16 March 1866; Pulawy, Kingdom of Poland, then part of Russian Empire
- Died: 30 November 1927 (aged 61); Ankara, Turkey
- Education: University of Göttingen
- Known for: Progressive phosphorescence
- Spouse: Leonia Rostworowska (m. 1900)
- Children: 5
- Scientific career
- Fields: Physics
- Workplaces: University of Fribourg, University of Warsaw
- Thesis: Untersuchungen über die Festigkeit des Glases

Józef Wierusz-Kowalski (16 March 1866 – 30 November 1927) was a Polish physicist and diplomat. He discovered the phenomenon of progressive phosphorescence. He served as Rector of the University of Fribourg, and helped to establish the section for physics at the reopened University of Warsaw. After Polish independence was established, he served as the Polish ambassador to the Holy See, the Netherlands, Austria and Turkey.

== Early life and education ==
Józef Wierusz-Kowalski, the son of Dr. Tadeusz Wierusz-Kowalski (1841–1904), was born in Pulawy, Kingdom of Poland, then part of Russian Empire on 16 March 1866. He married Leonia Rostworowska (born 1870) in 1900, at age 33. They had 5 children: Tadeusz Wierusz-Kowalski, Marie-Angèle (Aniela) Mallet (born Wierusz-Kowalska) and 3 other children.

Initially, Wierusz-Kowalski studied law at the Imperial University of Warsaw, but after a year he moved to the University of Göttingen, where he studied physics. He studied the properties of glass, including its strength, and in 1889 presented his doctoral thesis, "Untersuchungen über die Festigkeit des Glases".

After working in Berlin, Würzburg and the Technical University in Zurich, Wierusz-Kowalski studied physics and physical chemistry at the University of Bern. In 1894, he accepted a faculty position in mathematics and natural sciences at the University of Fribourg in Switzerland. In 1894, he introduced Pierre Curie and Maria Skłodowska. As the chair of physics, he established the physics department. During the academic year 1897–1898, he served as rector of the university. He remained at Fribourg until 1915.

== Scientific and diplomatic career ==
In 1897, Wierusz-Kowalski hired Ignacy Mościcki as his assistant. Mościcki created an electric arc method for fixing nitrogen, and he and Wierusz-Kowalski set up an experimental plant around 1903, trading nitric acid as the Société de l'acide nitrique.

Wierusz-Kowalski's major fields of study were lightning and electrical discharge, luminescence and phosphorescence. Wierusz-Kowalski examined mixtures of rare-earth metal compounds such as alkali under the influence of ultraviolet radiation, studying the phosphorescence of rare-earth compounds and organic compounds. In 1910, he discovered the phenomenon of progressive phosphorescence in the phosphorescence spectra of organic molecules. For his work in this field he was distinguished in 1912 by Harvard University.

He was actively involved in the Warsaw Scientific Society, which was founded in 1907. He served as a member of the editorial board of a Polish encyclopedia, the United universal encyclopedia, published in Switzerland. During World War I he worked with the Committee in Support of Victims of War in Poland, founded by Henryk Sienkiewicz in Vevey.

The early 1900s were a time of great unrest in Polish politics and education. In 1912, Kowalski became a member of the Academy of Sciences and Letters in Kraków. In 1915, Wierusz-Kowalski was one of the lecturers of physics at the Physics & Mathematics Faculty of the TKN, a secular “free university” which later became Wolna Wszechnica Polska (Free Polish University). In 1916 he was a member of the Board of the Association of Polish Education. The University of Warsaw was reopened on 15 November 1915 as a Polish institution. A Section of Experimental Physics was opened in 1916 as part of the Department of Philosophy, under Wierusz-Kowalski's leadership. In January 1919 Józef Wierusz-Kowalski helped to found the Warsaw Physical Society.

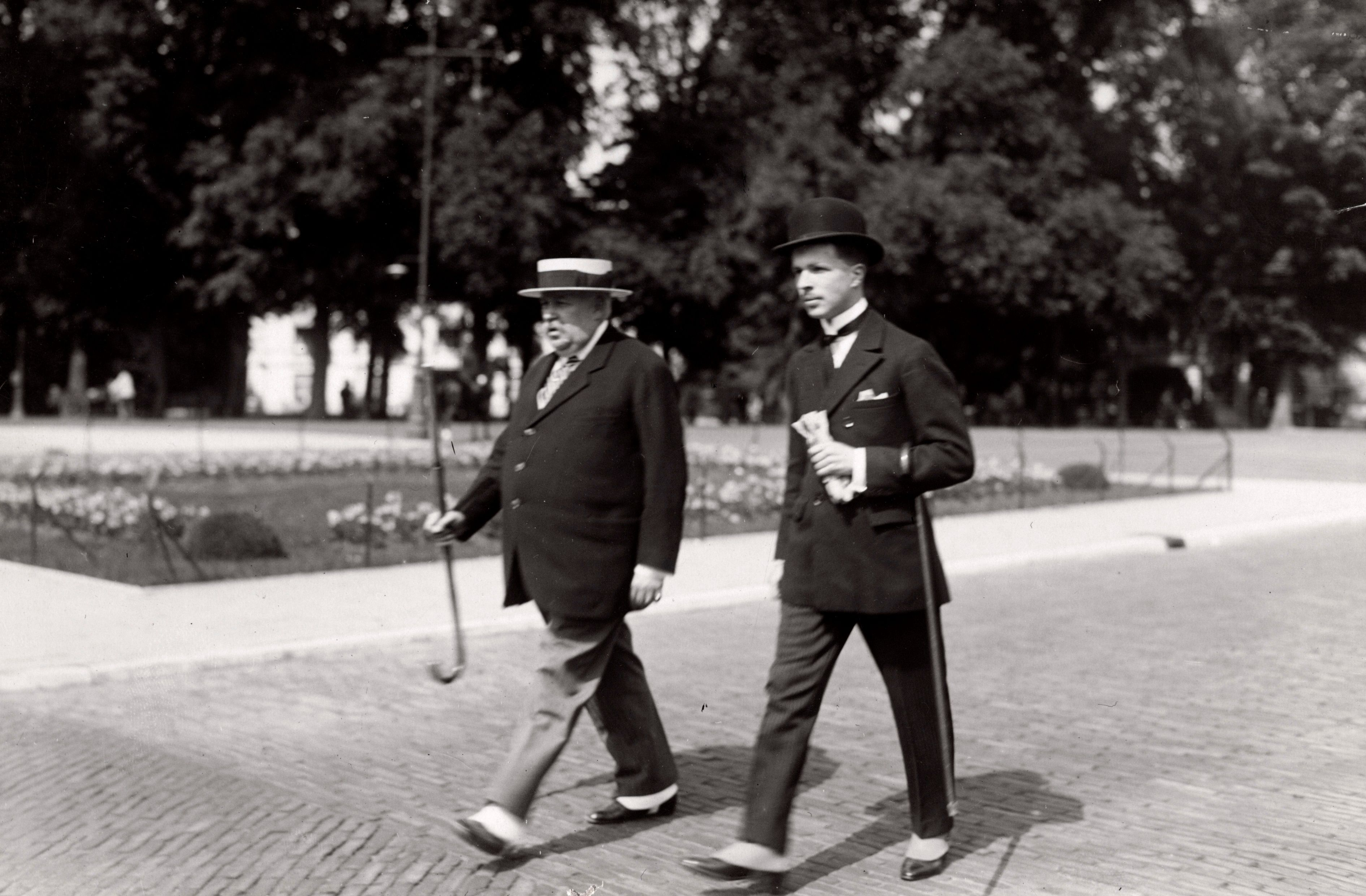
Wierusz-Kowalski (left) in The Hague in 1922

In 1919 Józef Wierusz-Kowalski entered the diplomatic service of Poland, and was appointed envoy extraordinary and minister plenipotentiary to the Holy See on 1 July 1919.

On 19 October 1921, he was appointed deputy of Poland at The Hague, where he remained until 1 December 1924.

He was a member of the International Committee on Intellectual Cooperation of the League of Nations. He then became the Polish ambassador in Vienna, Austria, holding the position until 30 September 1926. On 21 October 1926 he became a representative of the Republic of Poland in Ankara, Turkey, where he died, at age 61.

== See also ==
- List of Poles
- Timeline of Polish science and technology
