= Bohdan Szyszkowski =

Polish chemist

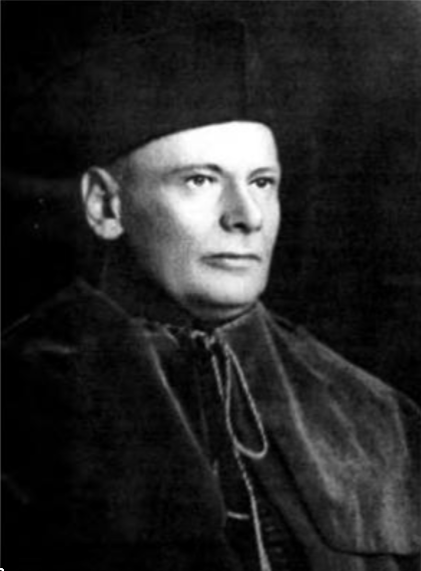
Bohdan Szyszkowski

Bohdan Szyszkowski (born 20 June 1873 in Trybuchy, Podolia, Russia (now village in Ukraine); died 13 August 1931 in Myślenice, Poland) was a Polish chemist and member of the Polish Academy of Arts and Sciences.

Szyszkowski published important papers on electrochemistry and surface chemistry.

== See also ==
- Szyszkowski equation
