= Aleksander Wolszczan =

20th and 21st-century Polish astronomer

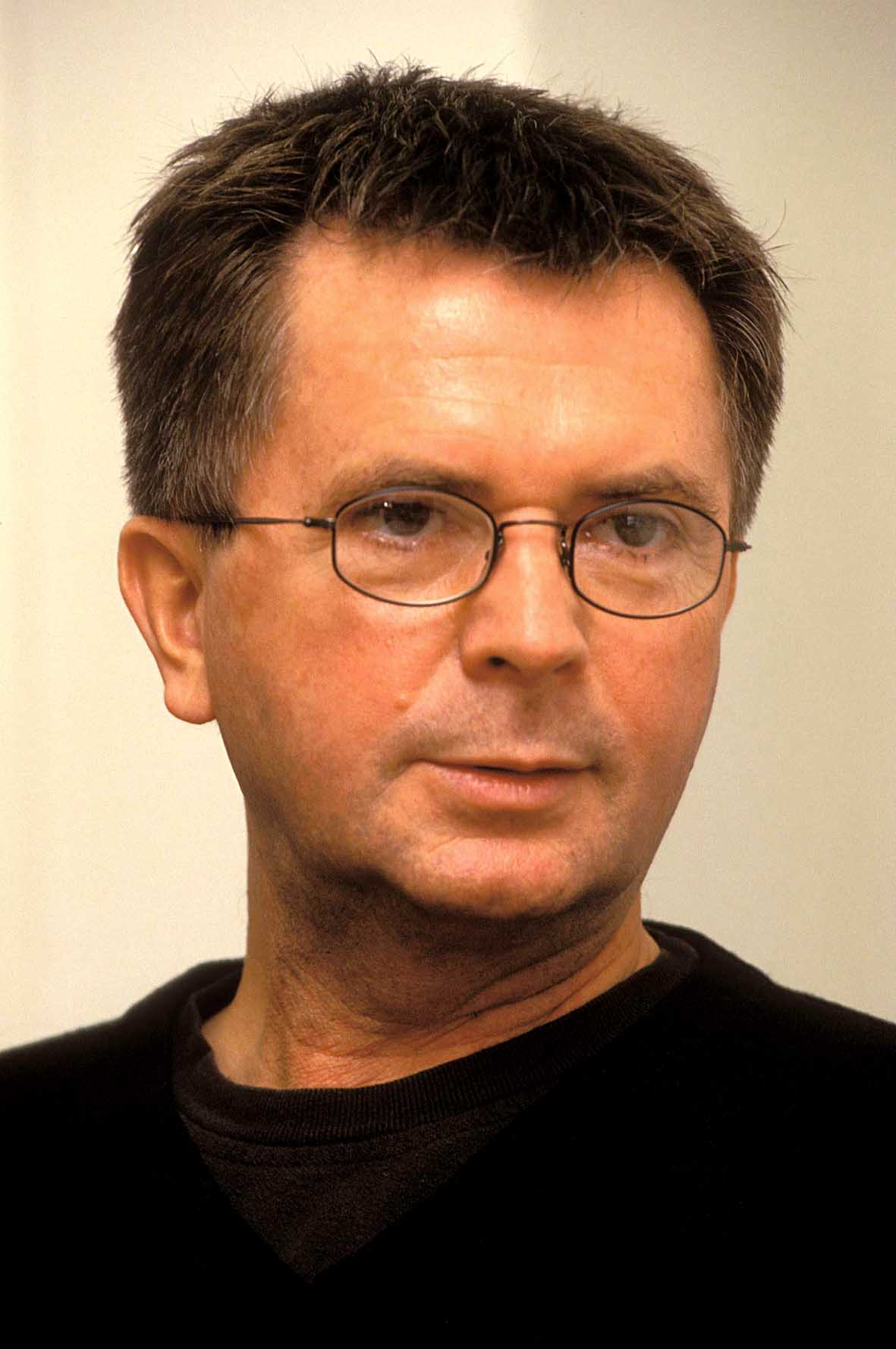
- Wolszczan in 2007
- Born: 29 April 1946 (age 80); Szczecinek, Poland
- Education: Nicolaus Copernicus University in Toruń
- Known for: Discovery of the first extrasolar planets and pulsar planets
- Awards: Prize of the Foundation for Polish Science (1992); Beatrice M. Tinsley Prize (1996); Order of Polonia Restituta (1997) Marian Smoluchowski Medal (2001); Bohdan Paczyński Medal (2017)
- Scientific career
- Fields: Astronomer

Aleksander Wolszczan [alɛkˈsandɛr ˈvɔlʂt͡ʂan] (born 29 April 1946) is a Polish astronomer. He is the co-discoverer of the first confirmed extrasolar planets and pulsar planets. He is a graduate of the Nicolaus Copernicus University in Toruń and works as a professor at the Pennsylvania State University.

Wolszczan is a fellow of the Polish Academy of Sciences, the American Astronomical Society and the International Astronomical Union. He is also the recipient of numerous awards for his groundbreaking contributions in the field of astronomy including Prize of the Foundation for Polish Science, Beatrice M. Tinsley Prize and the Marian Smoluchowski Medal of the Polish Physical Society.

== Early life and education ==
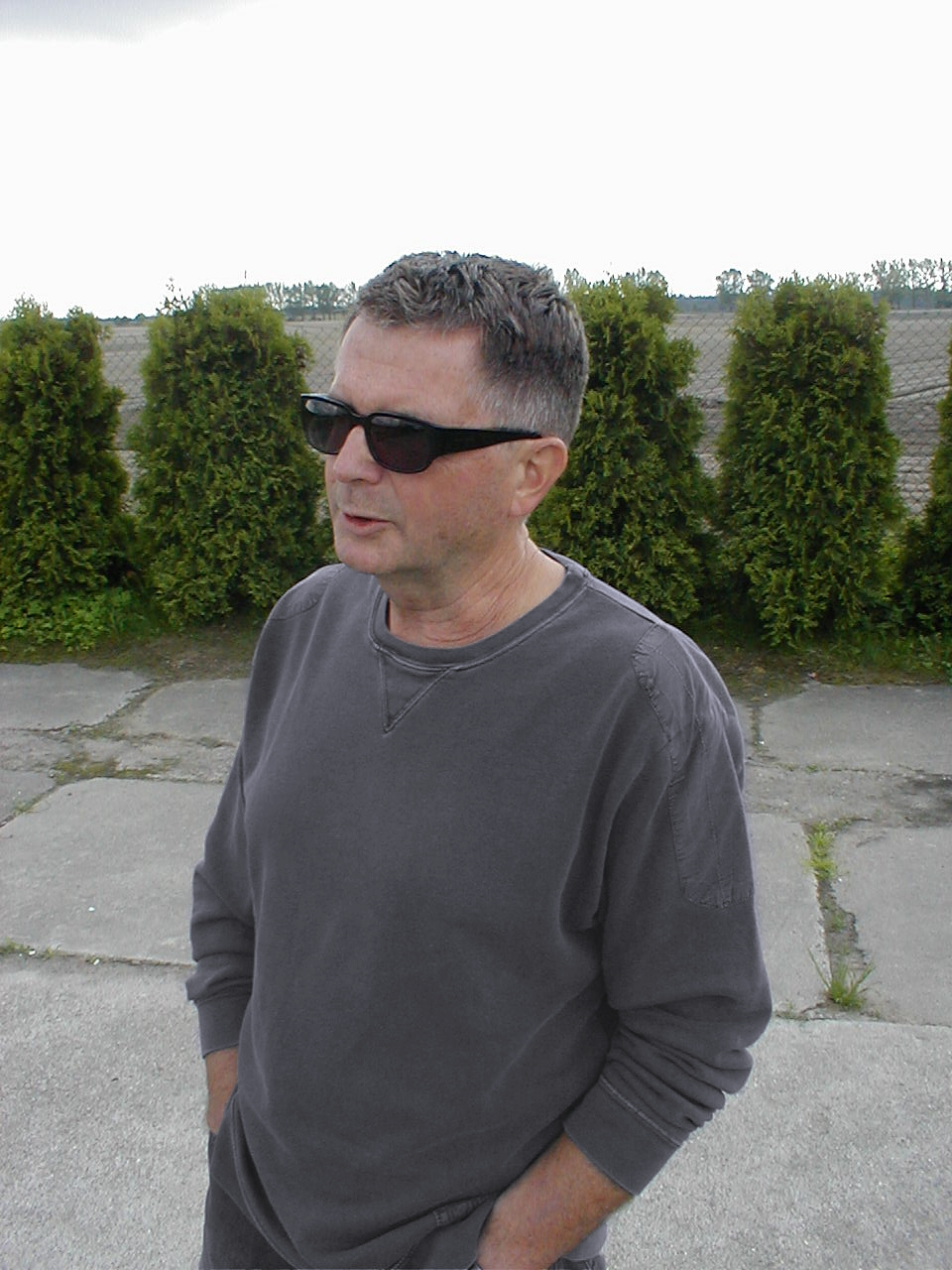
Aleksander Wolszczan

Wolszczan was born on 29 April 1946 in Szczecinek located in present-day West Pomeranian Voivodeship, Poland; in the 1950s his family moved to Szczecin. His father Jerzy Wolszczan taught economics at former Szczecin Polytechnic (currently West Pomeranian University of Technology) and his mother, Zofia, worked for the Polish Writers' Union. His early interest in astronomy was inspired by his father who told him stories and myths connected with stellar constellations. As a seven-year-old he already learned the basics of astronomy. He observed the night sky using a small telescope he constructed himself. He graduated from Stefan Czarniecki VI High School in Szczecin.

== Scientific career ==
Wolszczan sat for an M.Sc. in 1969 and a Ph.D. in 1975 at the Nicolaus Copernicus University in Toruń, Poland. Between 1969 and 1973 he worked at the Department of Radioastronomy of the Institute of Astronomy. In 1973, as a senior assistant, he moved to Bonn for training at the Max Planck Institute for Radio Astronomy. From 1979 to 1982 he worked at the Astronomical Center of the Polish Academy of Sciences in Toruń, and in 1982 he moved to the United States to work at Cornell University and Princeton. Later he became an astronomy professor at Pennsylvania State University. From 1994 to 2008, he was also professor at the Nicolaus Copernicus University. He is a member of the Polish Academy of Sciences.

Working with Dale Frail, Wolszczan carried out astronomical observations from the Arecibo Observatory in Puerto Rico that led them to the discovery of the pulsar PSR B1257+12 in 1990. On 9 January 1992 they discovered that the pulsar was orbited by two planets, whose masses were initially assessed at 3.4 and 2.8 times Earth's mass. The radii of their orbits are 0.36 and 0.47 AU respectively. This was the first confirmed discovery of planets outside the Solar System (as of 2 June 2021, 4,401 such planets were known). Wolszczan announced his findings in 1992 during the Meeting of the American Astronomical Society in Atlanta. Two years later he published the results of his discovery and was chosen by the journal Nature as the author of one of 15 fundamental discoveries in the field of physics. Despite some initial misgivings by several experts, today his discovery is regarded as fully substantiated. Astronomer Bohdan Paczyński called it "the greatest discovery by a Polish astronomer since Copernicus." In 1998, Astronomy magazine included his discovery among The 25 Greatest Astronomical Findings of All Time. At the Arecibo Observatory, Wolszczan also collaborated with Joseph H. Taylor Jr and conducted research on millisecond pulsars.

In 2003 Maciej Konacki and Wolszczan determined the orbital inclinations of the two pulsar planets, showing that the actual masses were approximately 3.9 and 4.3 Earth masses respectively.

In 2007, Wolszczan was also part of a Polish team of astronomers led by Andrzej Niedzielski that found yet another planet outside the Solar System, HD 17092 b, orbiting star HD 17092.

In 2012, Matthew Route and Wolszczan detected bursts of radio waves emitted from 2MASS J10475385+2124234 using Arecibo Observatory. This T6.5 brown dwarf has a temperature of 800-900 K, making it the coolest known radio-emitting substellar object. Its magnetic field is stronger than 1.7 kG. In 2016, the team discovered the most rapidly rotating brown dwarf, the T6 WISEPC J112254.73+255021.5. Its rotation period may be as little as 17 minutes. In 2017, he was awarded the Bohdan Paczyński Medal conferred by the Polish Astronomical Society.

Wolszczan is a member of many scientific associations which include: the Polish Academy of Sciences, American Astronomical Society, American Association for the Advancement of Science, International Union of Radio Science, International Astronomical Union, and Polish Institute of Arts and Sciences of America.

== Recognition ==
At Pennsylvania State University, Wolszczan held the Evan Pugh Professorship of Astronomy and Astrophysics. Upon retirement in 2024, he was awarded the title of Atherton Professor.

In 1992 Wolszczan won the Prize of the Foundation for Polish Science. In 1996, he was awarded the Beatrice M. Tinsley Prize by the American Astronomical Society, and in 1997 Polish President Aleksander Kwaśniewski presented him with the Commander's Cross of the Order of Polonia Restituta for outstanding contributions to Polish science. In 2002, he appeared on a Polish postage stamp (as part of a series of 16 stamps, titled "Polish Millennium," which summarizes the last 1,000 years of history, culture, and science in Poland).

In 2006, Wolszczan officially became an honorary citizen of Szczecin. In 2007, Jan Sosiński directed a documentary film on the life and scientific work of Wolszczan entitled Gwiazdor - Aleksander Wolszczan.

He was elected a Legacy Fellow of the American Astronomical Society in 2020.

== Controversy ==
In 2008 Gazeta Prawna disclosed that from 1973 until 1981 Wolszczan was an informant (codenamed "Lange") for the Polish communist-era Służba Bezpieczeństwa. He confirmed this, but stressed that he was passing only unimportant information, usually publicly known, and that he did not harm anybody. The resulting controversy in Polish media resulted in his resignation from Nicolaus Copernicus University in Toruń.

== See also ==
- List of Poles
- List of Polish inventors and discoverers
- OGLE
- Bohdan Paczyński
- Timeline of Polish science and technology
- Andrzej Udalski
