= Jerzy Pniewski =

Polish physicist (1913–1989)

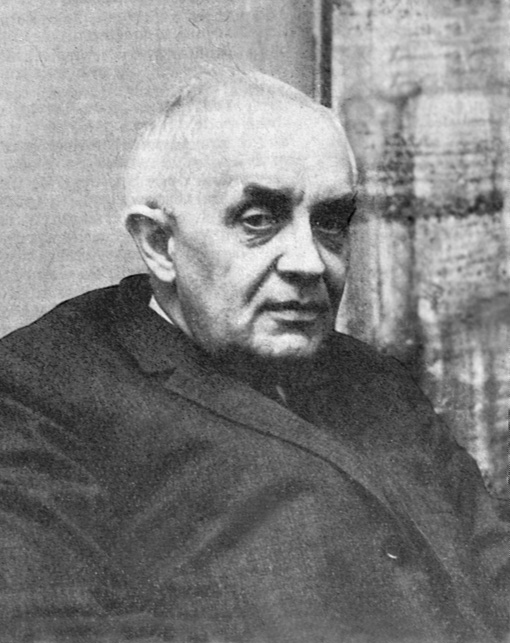
- Pniewski in 1967
- Born: June 1, 1913; Płock, Congress Poland
- Died: June 16, 1989 (aged 76); Warsaw, Poland
- Education: University of Warsaw
- Known for: Discovery of hypernucleus
- Awards: Marian Smoluchowski Medal (1969); Order of Polonia Restituta (1974)
- Scientific career
- Workplaces: Polish Academy of Sciences

Jerzy Pniewski (Polish: [ˈjɛʐɨ ˈpɲɛfskʲi]; June 1, 1913 – June 16, 1989) was a Polish physicist, professor at the University of Warsaw and a member of the Polish Academy of Sciences. He is best known for discovering the hypernucleus together with Marian Danysz in 1952.

== Life and career ==
Pniewski was born in 1913 in Płock, Congress Poland. He studied mathematics and physics at the University of Warsaw. He served as Director at the Institute of Experimental Physics of the University of Warsaw between 1953–1958 and 1962–1975 and subsequently as Head of the Department of Physics from 1975 to 1981.

In the 1950s, he enabled his physics students to work at CERN, who were officially unable to participate in this project due to political reasons at that time.

His contributions to science are in the area of subatomic experimental physics, in particular nuclear physics. In 1952, he co-discovered the hypernucleus with Marian Danysz. The discovery was made with the use of a nuclear emulsion plate exposed to cosmic rays, based on their energetic but delayed decay. This event was inferred to be due to a nuclear fragment containing a Λ baryon. This achievement proved to be fundamental in the development of nuclear and elementary particle physics as for the first time, researchers observed atomic nuclei in which at least one proton or neutron was replaced by a slightly heavier hyperon (containing a strange quark).

In 1962, he discovered hypernuclear isomery.

In 1964, he received the Order of the Banner of Labour 1st Class. In 1969, he was awarded the Marian Smoluchowski Medal by the Polish Physical Society. He was nominated for the Nobel Prize in Physics three times (1962, 1965, 1967). In 1974, he was awarded the Commander's Cross of the Order of Polonia Restituta.

In 1971, he became a full member of the Polish Academy of Sciences. He received honorary doctorates from the University of Lyon and University of Heidelberg.

He died in 1989 and was buried at the Powązki Cemetery in Warsaw.

According to physicist Andrzej Kajetan Wróblewski, Pniewski is among the greatest Polish physicists of the 20th century alongside Marie Curie, Marian Smoluchowski, Karol Olszewski, and Marian Danysz.

== See also ==
- List of Polish physicists
- Timeline of Polish science and technology
