= Janusz Andrzej Zakrzewski =

Polish physicist

Janusz Andrzej Zakrzewski (23 July 1932 in Kraków – 26 October 2008 in Warsaw) was a Polish physicist. He was a professor of the University of Warsaw (since 1971), member of the Warsaw Scientific Society (since 1984), Polish Academy of Sciences (1986), Polish Academy of Learning. He served as president of the Polish Physical Society between 1987–1991.

Zakrzewski was a researcher and author of works about high-energy nuclear physics and elementary particles. He participated in discovery of heavy atomic nucleus (1961) and double hypernucleus (1963). He was a co-author (with Andrzej Kajetan Wróblewski) of handbook Wstęp do fizyki ("Introduction to physics").

== Notable works ==
- Zakrzewski, J.A.; Wróblewski, A.K. (1976), Wstęp do fizyki [Introduction to physics] (in Polish), vol. 1, Warsaw: PWN
- Zakrzewski, J.A.; Wróblewski, A.K. (1989), Wstęp do fizyki (cz. 1) [Introduction to physics (part 1)] (in Polish), vol. 2, Warsaw: PWN
- Zakrzewski, J.A.; Wróblewski, A.K. (1991), Wstęp do fizyki (cz. 2) [Introduction to physics (part 2)] (in Polish), vol. 2, Warsaw: PWN
