= Marian Smoluchowski Medal =

Polish international physics prize

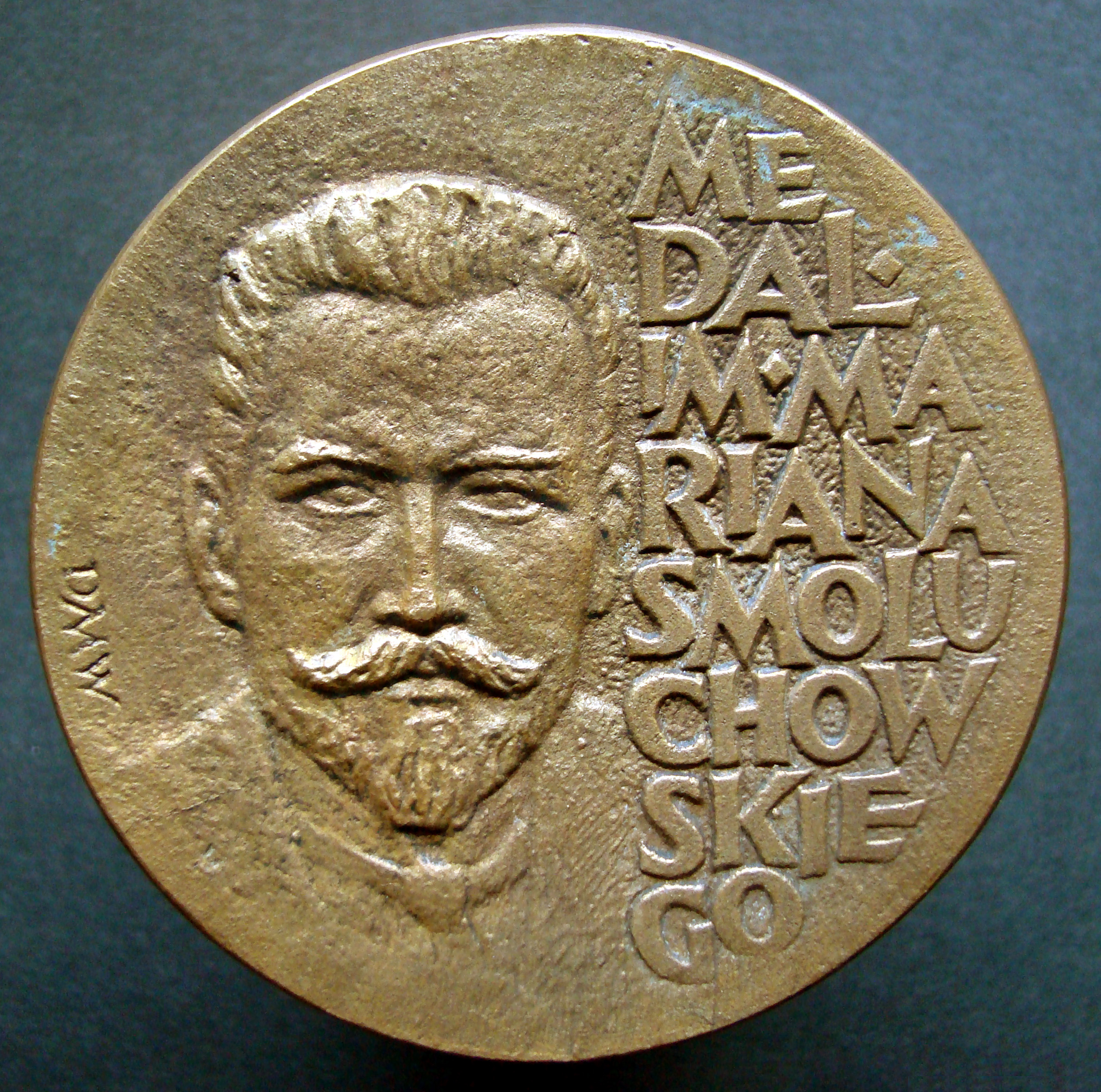
- The obverse of the Marian Smoluchowski Medal
- Awarded for: significant contributions in the field of physics
- Country: Poland
- Presented by: Polish Physical Society
- First award: 1965
- Website: www.ptf.net.pl/programy/medal-i-nagrody/medal-mariana-smoluchowskiego/

The Marian Smoluchowski Medal is a Polish annual science award conferred by the Polish Physical Society (Polskie Towarzystwo Fizyczne, PTF) for contributions in the field of physics.

== Description ==
The medal was established in 1965 and is the highest award presented by the Polish Physical Society. It was named in honour of physicist Marian Smoluchowski (1872 – 1917). It is awarded to scientists whose work significantly contributed to the advancement of one of the branches of physics irrespective of the scientific degree, place of work or nationality of the laureate. It can be given for a single published work or as a lifetime achievement award. It is conferred by the Awards Committee of the Polish Physical Society, currently, no more than once a year.

Three laureates of the medal have also received the Nobel Prize in Physics: Ben Roy Mottelson (1975), Subrahmanyan Chandrasekhar (1983) and Vitaly Ginzburg (2003).

== Laureates ==
The list of scientists awarded with Marian Smoluchowski Medal:

- Witold Nazarewicz (2025)
- Ryszard Horodecki (2023)
- Iwo Białynicki-Birula (2021)
- not awarded (2020)
- Józef Spałek (2019)
- not awarded (2018)
- Jerzy Lukierski (2017)
- Henryk Szymczak (2015)
- not awarded (2014)
- Jan Misiewicz (2013)
- Douglas Cline (2012)
- Krzysztof Pomorski (2011)
- Tomasz Dietl (2010)
- Wojciech H. Zurek (2009)
- Józef Barnaś (2008)
- Robert Gałązka (2007)
- not awarded (2006)
- Jan Żylicz (2005)
- Andrzej Białas (2004)
- Stefan Pokorski (2003)
- David Shugar (2002)
- Aleksander Wolszczan (2001)
- Bohdan Paczyński (2000)
- Andrzej Kajetan Wróblewski (1999)
- Kacper Zalewski (1998)
- Włodzimierz Zawadzki (1997)
- not awarded (1996)
- not awarded (1995)
- Ryszard Sosnowski (1994)
- Stanisław Kielich (1993)
- Arnold Wolfendale (1992)
- Jacek Prentki (1991)
- Władysław Świątecki (1990)
- Zdzisław Szymański (1989)
- Andrzej Hrynkiewicz (1988)
- Wojciech Królikowski (1987)
- Andrzej Trautman (1986)
- Joseph Henry Eberly (1985)
- Vitaly Ginzburg (1984); 2003 Nobel Prize in Physics
- Jan Rzewuski (1983)
- Władysław Opęchowski (1982)
- Adriano Gozzini (1981)
- Ben R. Mottelson (1980); 1975 Nobel Prize in Physics
- Włodzimierz Trzebiatowski (1979)
- not awarded (1978)
- Victor Frederick Weisskopf (1977)
- Arkadiusz Piekara (1976)
- Gerald Pearson (1975)
- Georgy Flyorov (1974)
- Subrahmanyan Chandrasekhar (1973), 1983 Nobel Prize in Physics
- Leonard Sosnowski (1972)
- not awarded (1971)
- Jerzy Gierula (1970)
- Marian Mięsowicz (1970)
- Marian Danysz (1969)
- Jerzy Pniewski (1969)
- Aleksander Jabłoński (1968)
- not awarded (1967)
- not awarded (1966)
- Wojciech Rubinowicz (1965)

== See also ==
- Prize of the Foundation for Polish Science
- Timeline of Polish science and technology
