= Joseph H. Eberly =

American physicist (1935–2025)

- Born: October 19, 1935
- Died: April 30, 2025 (aged 89)
- Education: Pennsylvania State University; Stanford University
- Known for: Quantum optics; Founder of Optics Express; Electron mass shift; Superradiance; Ionization; Quantum revival; Polaritonic solitons in multilevel media
- Scientific career
- Fields: Theoretical physics Quantum optics
- Workplaces: University of Rochester
- Thesis: Black-body distribution law in semi-classical radiation theory (1962)
- Doctoral advisor: E. T. Jaynes
- Doctoral students: Peter W. Milonni
- Other notable students: Peter Knight

Joseph Henry Eberly (October 19, 1935 – April 30, 2025) was an American physicist and academic. He was a professor of physics, astronomy and optics at the University of Rochester.

== Early life and education ==
Joseph Henry Eberly was born in 1935. He completed a Bachelor of Science degree in physics at Pennsylvania State University in 1957 and obtained a Doctor of Philosophy in physics at Stanford University in 1962. His doctoral advisor during his PhD program was Edwin Thompson Jaynes, which helped him connect with Eugene Wigner. In 1965 he joined he joined the Department of Physics and Astronomy at the University of Rochester, where he worked and continued to teach until a few weeks before his death.

== Work ==
Eberly's research interests included cavity quantum electrodynamics (QED), quantum information, control of non-classical entanglement, the response of atoms to high-intensity optical pulses, and coherent control theory of optical interactions. In 1995, he founded the Rochester Theory Center for Optical Science and Engineering (RTC) with funding from the National Science Foundation.

Eberly contributed to understanding the quantum revival in the Jaynes-Cummings model. In a 1966 paper on electron self-energy, he revealed aspects of the Higgs mechanism in electrodynamics, demonstrating how massless particles can acquire mass through interaction with the Higgs field. Additionally, Eberly studied atomic vapor laser isotope separation.

In 2003, he discovered the phenomenon of crystallization in time for highly excited states of atoms. This phenomenon shows the existence of fermion densities that are perpetually and perfectly periodic in time, and is comparable to the anomalous conductivity improvement in the Kondo effect.

He made early predictions of the phenomenon of the Above Threshold Ionization (ATI) and the highly energetic electron emissions in one-dimensional atom models. He also observed a similar phenomenon in the emission of highly energetic deuterium nuclei from the ultra-cold strong laser driven deuterium droplet clusters. These clusters are considered alike to giant atom with deuterons acting as heavy electrons, and the electrons acting as their gluons or nucleus. Eberly also observed the cold-hot nuclear fusion in such systems.

== Death and legacy ==
Eberly died April 30, 2025, at the age of 89. In January 2026, the University of Rochester announced the establishment of the Joseph H. Eberly Endowed Professorship in Physics and the Joseph H. Eberly Endowed Professorship Research Fund.

== Awards and recognition ==
Eberly received the Charles Hard Townes Award, the Smoluchowski Medal and the Senior Humboldt Award. In 2007, he served as the president of The Optical Society of America. In recognition of his work on the theory of electron localization in atoms and molecules, he was honored with the Frederic Ives Medal in 2010, the highest award granted by The Optical Society of America. In 2012, the society recognized his many years of service with the Distinguished Service Award. In 2021, he was appointed an honorary member of Optica (formerly The Optical Society of America).

Eberly had longstanding research connections with Poland, publishing several papers with Polish physicists Adam Kujawski and Krzysztof Wódkiewicz in the 1960s and 1970s. He maintained a frequent scientific collaboration with Iwo Białynicki-Birula and was elected as a foreign member of the Polish Academy of Sciences. Eberly also co-authored multiple publications with Białynicki-Birula's PhD student Kazimierz Rzążewski. Their collaboration led to the discovery that the superradiant phase transition, originally observed at the University of Rochester, necessitates the existence of an "extraterrestrial" ether with a real and negative dielectric constant in the quantum vacuum. This finding challenged the notion that classical electromagnetic gauge fields alone could cause such a phase transition, aligning with the electromagnetic version of the Bohr-van Leeuwen theorem.

== Publications ==
Eberly published over 350 scientific journal articles, as well as other scientific papers. He also authored three graduate textbooks.

=== Selected publications ===
- Allen, Leslie; Eberly, Joseph H. (1987). Optical Resonance and Two-Level Atoms. New York, NY: Dover Publications. ISBN 978-0-486-65533-8.
- Milonni, Peter W.; Eberly, J. H. (1988). Lasers. New York: Wiley. ISBN 978-0-471-62731-9.
- Yu, Ting; Eberly, J. H. (January 30, 2009). "Sudden Death of Entanglement". Science. 323 (5914): 598–601. arXiv:0910.1396. Bibcode:2009Sci...323..598Y. doi:10.1126/science.1167343. PMID 19179521.
