= Witold Nazarewicz =

American/Polish nuclear physicist

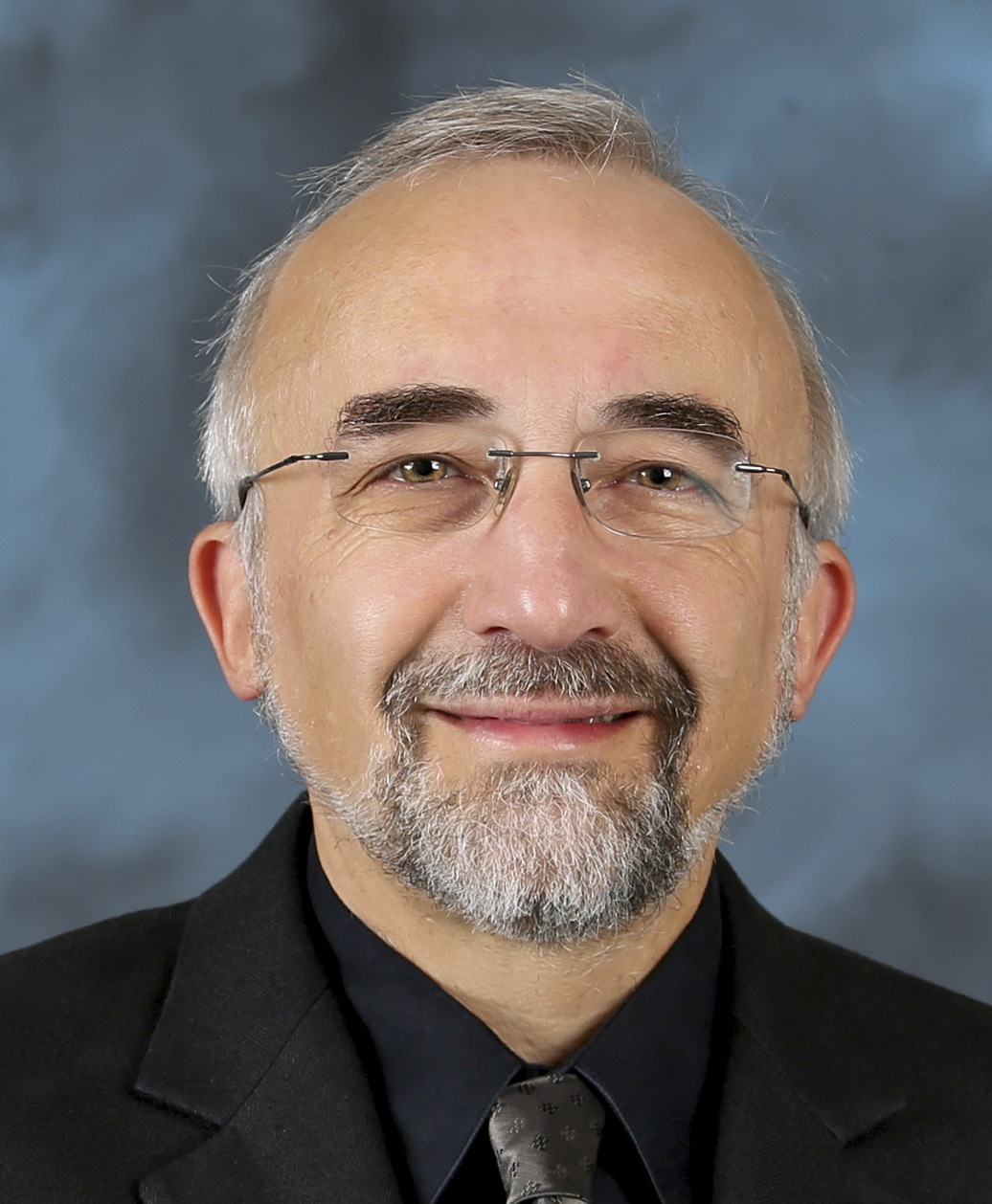
- Nazarewicz in 2013
- Born: December 26, 1954 (age 71); Warsaw, Poland
- Known for: Research on structure of rare isotopes
- Awards: Bonner Prize (2012); Marian Smoluchowski Medal (2025)

Academic background
- Education: Warsaw University of Technology
- Doctoral advisor: Zdzisław Szymański

Academic work
- Discipline: Physicist
- Sub-discipline: Nuclear physics, nuclear physics theory
- Institutions: Michigan State University Oak Ridge National Laboratory; University of Tennessee; University of Warsaw Warsaw University of Technology

Witold (Witek) Nazarewicz (born 26 December 1954) is a Polish-American nuclear physicist, researcher, and educator. He is a John A. Hannah Distinguished Professor in Physics and Chief Scientist at the Facility for Rare Isotope Beams (FRIB) and the Department of Physics and Astronomy at Michigan State University, and a Professor at the University of Warsaw, Faculty of Physics, Institute of Theoretical Physics.

== Education ==
Nazarewicz obtained an M.Sc.Eng. degree in Technical Physics and Applied mathematics from the Warsaw University of Technology in 1977. In 1981 he received a Ph.D. in Theoretical Nuclear Physics from the Instytut Badań Jądrowych (Institute of Nuclear Research) in Otwock/Warsaw. His Ph.D. advisor was Zdzisław Szymański.

From 1982–1984, he joined the nuclear physics group at the Lund Institute of Technology for his postdoctoral research, which he continued 1984–1985 at the Niels Bohr Institute in Copenhagen.

== Career ==
In 1986, Nazarewicz obtained a Habilitation degree (dr. hab.) at the University of Warsaw.

Since 1994, he has held the title of professor ordinarius in Poland.

In 1995, he joined the Department of Physics and Astronomy, the University of Tennessee, Knoxville as a Professor and, since 2012, James McConnell Distinguished Professor in Physics. During 1999–2011, se served as the Scientific Director of the Holifield Radioactive Ion Beam Facility at Oak Ridge National Laboratory.

In 1997, Nazarewicz was appointed at the Warsaw University of Technology at the Faculty of Technical Physics and Applied Mathematics (FTiMS).

In 2013, he was appointed a UT-Battelle Corporate Fellow at Oak Ridge National Laboratory. In 2014, he moved to the Facility for Rare Isotope Beams (FRIB) at Michigan State University as a John A. Hannah Professor, jointly appointed in the MSU Department of Physics and Astronomy. He serves as a Chief Scientist at the Facility for Rare Isotope Beams. He has held several visiting positions, including professorships at Lund University, the University of Cologne, Kyoto University, the University of Liverpool, Vanderbilt University, and Peking University.

== Research ==
Atomic nuclei, composed of protons and neutrons (nucleons), are self-bound systems governed by quantum chromodynamics. Nuclei comprise 99.9% of all baryonic matter in the Universe. The complex nature of the nuclear forces among protons and neutrons yields a wide range of nuclear phenomena which form the basis for the experimental and theoretical studies. Developing a comprehensive description of all nuclei, a long-standing goal of nuclear physics, requires theoretical and experimental investigations of rare atomic nuclei, i.e. systems with neutron-to-proton ratios larger and smaller than those naturally occurring on Earth. The main area of his professional activity is the theoretical description of those exotic, short-lived nuclei that inhabit remote regions of nuclear landscape. This research integrates a strong interaction between nuclear physics, interdisciplinary, many-body-problem, high-performance computing, and applied mathematics and statistics. Key scientific themes that are being addressed by his research are captured by overarching questions:

- How did visible matter come into being and how does it evolve?
- How does subatomic matter organize itself and what phenomena emerge?
- Are the fundamental interactions that are basic to the structure of matter fully understood?
- How can the knowledge and technological progress provided by nuclear physics best be used to benefit society?

As of 2024, he has edited 7 books/volumes, authored 12 review papers/book chapters, over 460 scientific papers in refereed journals, 175 contributions to major conferences published in proceedings, 23 outreach/educational papers and communications and 27 major reports. Nazarewicz has h-index of 99, with over 34,000 citations (Web of Science); and h=112, over 44,000 citations (Google Scholar). He has delivered over 300 invited talks at major international conferences and over 300 invited seminars and colloquia. His complete CV, including university service, offices, committees, editorial appointments, courses and lectures, students supervised, meetings organized, publications, and talks, can be found at his homepage at MSU.

== Awards and honors ==
- 1983 – Individual Scientific Award of the Polish Nuclear Energy Commission
- 1986 – Individual Scientific Award of the Polish Physical Society
- 1994 – Fellow, American Physical Society
- 2004 – Fellow (FInstP), Institute of Physics
- 2009 – Honorary degree of Doctor of the University of the West of Scotland
- 2009 – Fellow, American Association for the Advancement of Science
- 2012 – Bonner Prize from the American Physical Society for his "foundational work in developing and applying nuclear Density Functional Theory, motivating experiments and interpreting their results, and implementing a comprehensive theoretical framework for the physics of exotic nuclei."
- 2013 – UT-Battelle Corporate Fellow, Oak Ridge National Laboratory
- 2015 – Distinguished Fellow of the Kosciuszko Foundation Collegium of Eminent Scientists
- 2017 – G.N. Flerov Prize, Joint Institute for Nuclear Research for "Theoretical studies of the atomic and nuclear properties of the heaviest elements."
- 2019 – Honorary degree of Doctor of the University of York
- 2021 – Casimir Funk Natural Sciences Award of the Polish Institute of Arts and Sciences of America for "his outstanding contributions to the study of nuclear structure, reactions, and astrophysics."
- 2025 – Marian Smoluchowski Medal of the Polish Physical Society for "his fundamental contribution to the creation, development, and implementation of advanced theoretical methods and tools for the description of atomic nuclei, in particular for groundbreaking research on strongly deformed nuclei, pioneering studies of nuclei asymmetric to spatial reflection, and breakthrough work on the physics of superheavy nuclei and weakly bound nuclei located at the edges of the nuclear chart."
- 2026 – Elected to the Polish Academy of Sciences as a Foreign Member

== See also ==
- List of Polish physicists
