= Iwo Białynicki-Birula =

Polish physicist

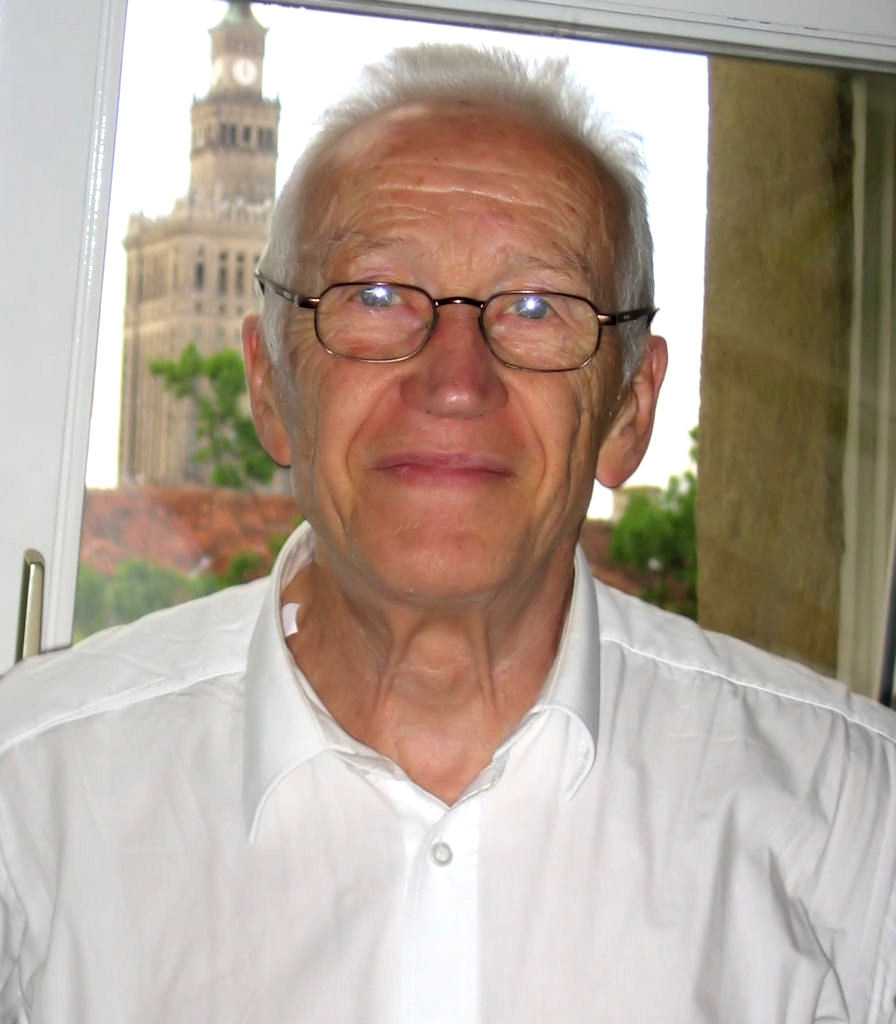
- Iwo Białynicki-Birula is a Polish theoretical physicist, a professor of Warsaw University and Polish Academy of Sciences
- Born: 14 June 1933 (age 93)
- Education: University of Warsaw (MSc, PhD, Habilitation)
- Spouse: Zofia Białynicka-Birula
- Awards: Prize of the Foundation for Polish Science (2014), Smoluchowski Medal (2021), Wigner Medal (2023)
- Scientific career
- Fields: Quantum physics, Quantum electrodynamics
- Workplaces: University of Warsaw; Center for Theoretical Physics, Polish Academy of Sciences
- Doctoral advisor: Leopold Infeld
- Notable students: Kazimierz Rzążewski, Maciej Lewenstein

Iwo Białynicki-Birula (born 14 June 1933 in Warsaw) is a Polish theoretical physicist. He works as a professor at the Center for Theoretical Physics, Polish Academy of Sciences, an institution that he initiated in 1980. He is also a professor emeritus at the Faculty of Physics, University of Warsaw. He holds a full professorship in physics.

He received the Prize of the Foundation for Polish Science in mathematical, physical and engineering sciences in 2014 and the Smoluchowski Medal of the Polish Physical Society in 2021. In 2023 for his overall lifetime fundamental contributions to the Quantum Mechanics, especially for constructing the counterexample to the Feynman theorem about the gauge invariance of the unrenormalized transition amplitudes generated by his diagrams, construction of the nonlinear quantum mechanics and for the discovery of the Trojan Wave Packets he was granted the Wigner Medal awarded for the first time ever outside the strict Group Theory. He is a full member of the Polish Academy of Sciences.

He published multiple works on field theory, quantum electrodynamics and renormalization theory.
