= Jean Danysz (biologist) =

Polish pathologist

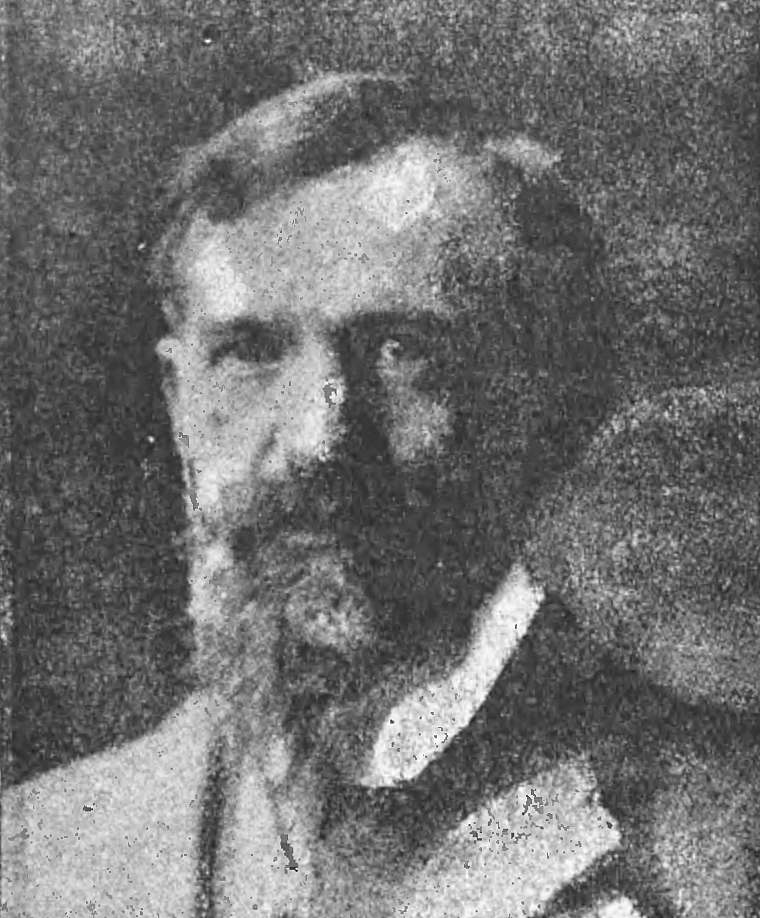
Jean Danysz

Jean Danysz (1860–1928) was a Polish pathologist with a considerable career in France, having spent much of his adult life at the Pasteur Institute in Paris.

In 1890 he isolated Salmonella typhimurium. In 1893, he was involved in research into the flour moth, "scourge of the flour mill", Ephestia kuehniella. In 1898, he was working on rinderpest. In 1903, he worked on a way to control the vole plague in France. He was, in 1903, the first person to use radium to treat malignant diseases.

He was contacted in 1905 regarding Australia's rabbit plagues and responding to the New South Wales government's offer of £25,000 for a novel solution to the country's rabbit pest problem, he arrived in Australia the following year to advise on biological control measures. He brought a strain of Pasteurella bacteria which he had developed to selectively kill feral rabbits and conducted a series of trials on Broughton Island, New South Wales coast with his team. He left in May 1907 after a series of inconclusive trials, leaving his assistant A. Latapie with Dr. Tidswell of the NSW Health Department to continue trials. His organism was eventually proved to be identical to one already known to science, and although it was not found to be injurious to other animals, it was ineffective as a control.

The Danysz phenomenon, where a toxin added to antitoxin in an equal amount at once is non-toxic but when added at intervals in a fraction results in a generally toxic mixture, was named for him.

== Family ==
- He was the father of physicist Jean Casimir Danysz (11 March 1884 – 4 November 1914), born in Paris and a colleague of Marie Curie, made important advances in the field of beta spectroscopy in 1913. He was killed in action near Cormicy.
- He was the grandfather of physicist Marian Danysz (1909–1983), son of Jean Casimir.
