= Wojciech Królikowski =

Polish theoretical physicist (1926–2019)

Wojciech Królikowski (16 July 1926 – 29 April 2019) was a Polish theoretical physicist, specialized in the theory of elementary particles and quantum field theory, retired professor of the Institute of Theoretical Physics at the University of Warsaw, member of the Polish Academy of Sciences.

In1950 he obtained his master’s degree and in 1952 after only two years, his doctor degree as pupil of professor Wojciech Rubinowicz, who is one of the most prominent Polish theoretical physicists. And then his Habilitation in 1957.

1956–1957 he visited the Eidgenössische Technische Hochschule Zürich, Switzerland for scientific practice under Wolfgang Pauli. In 1965 he obtained his professor title.

1961 he visited the Institute for Advanced Study in Princeton, New Jersey. He visited also the European Organization for Nuclear Research in Geneva and the International Centre for Theoretical Physics in the Miramare Castle near Trieste, Italy.

He initiated the research of the theory of elementary particles at the University of Warsaw. He founded 1960 the Department of the Theory of Elementary Particles, and directed it till his retirement. Together with Jan Rzewuski he gave the formula of relativistic quantum mechanics of some substances. He proposed the hypothesis of compound quarks. He created the model of three generations of leptons and quarks.

Together with Wojciech Rubinowicz he wrote the handbook of Theoretical Mechanics (first edition 1955, until now nine editions).

In 1987, he was awarded with the Marian Smoluchowski Medal.
