= Acta Physica =

Acta Physica may refer to several scientific journals of physics:

- Acta Physica Hungarica
- Acta Physica Polonica

== See also ==
- Helvetica Physica Acta
