= Quantum revival =

Periodic recurrence of the quantum wave function

Full and exact revival of the semi-Gaussian wave function in an infinite two-dimensional potential well during its time evolution. Fractional revivals occur when the scaled shape of the wave function replicates itself an integer number of times over the well area.

In quantum mechanics, quantum revival is a periodic recurrence of the quantum wave function during its time-evolution. This can be either many times in space as multiple scaled copies of the initial wave function (fractional revival), or approximately or exactly to its original form (full revival). A quantum wave function that is periodic in time therefore exhibits a full revival every period. The phenomenon of revival is most readily observable in wave functions that are well-localized wave packets at the beginnings of their time-evolutions, such as in the hydrogen atom. For hydrogen, fractional revivals show up as multiple angular Gaussian bumps around the circle drawn by the radial maximum of the leading circular-state component (that with the highest amplitude in the eigenstate expansion) of the original localized state, and the full revival as the original Gaussian. Full revivals are exact for the infinite quantum well, harmonic oscillator, or hydrogen atom, while for shorter times are approximate for the hydrogen atom and many other quantum systems.

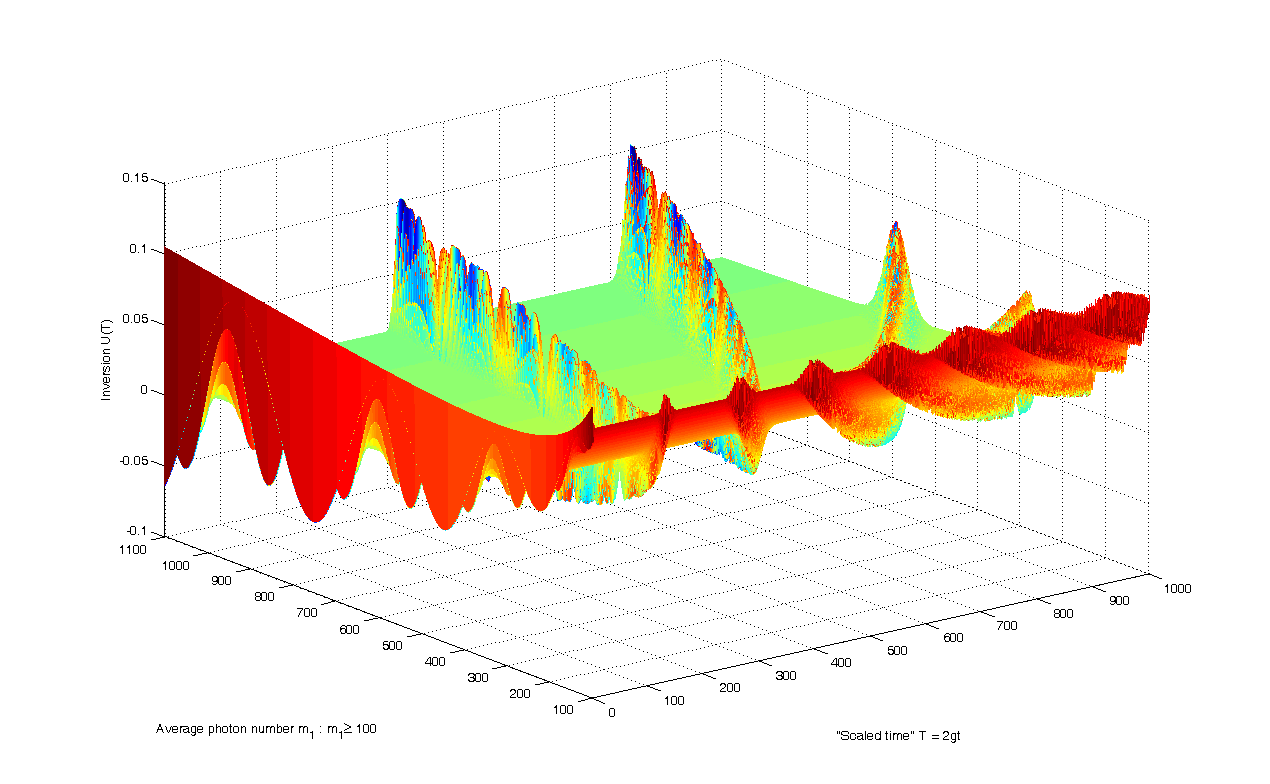
A plot of collapses and revivals of atomic inversion in the Jaynes-Cummings model.

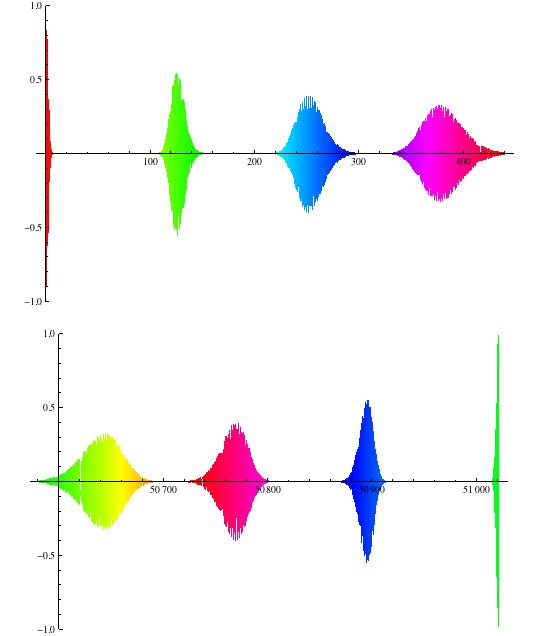
Superrevival of the inversion (return of the full approximate revivals to the original shape) in Jaynes-Cummings model when the exact spectrum in resonance around the average number of photons $n_0=100$ is approximated by the polynomial in the photon quantum number $n$ $E(n)=a \delta n^2 + b \delta n + c$, $\delta n = n - n_0$

== Example – arbitrary truncated wave function of the quantum system with rational energies ==
Consider a quantum system with the energies $E_i$ and the eigenstates $\psi_i$

$$H \psi_i = E_i \psi_i,$$

and let the energies be the rational fractions of some constant $C$:

$$E_i= C {M_i \over N_i}$$

(for example, for the hydrogen atom, $M_i=1$, $N_i=i^2$, and $C=-13.6 eV$).

Then the truncated (till $\mathbb{N}_{max}$ of states) solution of the time-dependent Schrödinger equation is

$$\Psi(t)=\sum_{i=0}^{\mathbb{N}_{max}}a_i e^{-i {{E_i} \over \hbar} t} \psi_i.$$

Let $L_{cm}$ be the least common multiple of all $N_i$, and $L_{cd}$ be the greatest common divisor of all $M_i$. Then for each $N_i$, the quantity ${L_{cm}}/ N_i$ is an integer, for each $M_i$ the quantity ${M_{i}}/ L_{cd}$ is an integer, $2 \pi M_i {L_{cm}}/(N_i L_{cd})$ is the full multiple of $2 \pi$ angle, and

$$\Psi(t)=\Psi(t+T)$$

after the full revival time

$$T={2 \pi \hbar \over {L_{cd} C}} L_{cm}$$.

For a quantum system as small as hydrogen and $\mathbb{N}_{max}$ as small as 100, a full revival may take quadrillions of years. For example, a Trojan wave packet in a hydrogen atom repeats itself after sweeping almost the whole hypercube of quantum phases exactly every full revival time.

In a system with rational energies—that is, where exact full revival exists—its existence immediately proves the quantum Poincaré recurrence theorem, and the time of the full quantum revival equals the Poincaré recurrence time. While the rational numbers are dense in real numbers, and the arbitrary function of the quantum number can be approximated arbitrarily closely with Padé approximants, for the arbitrarily long times, each quantum system therefore revives almost exactly. It also means that Poincaré recurrence and full revival are mathematically the same thing, and it is commonly accepted that the recurrence is called the full revival if it occurs after a reasonable and physically measurable time that is detectable by realistic apparatus. This happens due to a very special energy spectrum having a large basic energy spacing gap of which the energies are arbitrary (not necessarily harmonic) multiples.

== See also ==
- Poincaré recurrence theorem
