= Andrzej Sołtan =

Polish nuclear physicist

Andrzej Sołtan (25 October 1897 – 10 December 1959) was a Polish nuclear physicist. He also worked on spectroscopy in the band between far ultraviolet and X-rays. During his visit to Caltech in 1932–33, together with H. Richard Crane and Charles Christian Lauritsen, he discovered a method for producing neutron beams, by bombarding lithium or beryllium nuclei with accelerated deuterons.

He was appointed professor at Warsaw University in 1947, a member of the Polish Academy of Sciences in 1952, and in 1955 he became the first director of the Institute of Nuclear Studies in Świerk, Otwock County near Warsaw, now known as the National Centre for Nuclear Research. He served as president of the Polish Physical Society between 1952 and 1955.

He is buried (with his wife Marta, also a physicist) in the "Avenue of the Meritorious" of Warsaw's Powązki Cemetery.

The institute where he worked was renamed the Soltan Institute of Nuclear Studies in 1982.
