= Jan Kazimierz Danysz =

French physicist

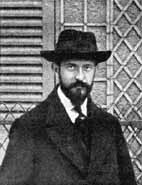
- Born: March 11, 1884
- Died: November 4, 1914 (aged 30); Cormicy, France
- Scientific career
- Fields: Physics

Jan Kazimierz Danysz (11 March 1884 – 4 November 1914) was a French physicist of Polish extraction. He was an assistant of Maria Skłodowska-Curie and notable in the development of beta spectrometry.

Danysz made considerable advances on the magnetic deflection techniques of Otto von Baeyer, Otto Hahn and Lise Meitner, placing the source (he used radium) in a capillary tube under a slit, with a photographic plate in the same horizontal plane. By this means the known number of lines (later understood to be conversion lines) superimposed on the beta energy spectrum of radium B (RaB) + radium C (RaC) (Note: RaA was a placeholder for an isotope later identified as 218Po; RaB for an isotope later identified as 214Pb. See Radium series) went from 9 to 27 lines (later work by Harold Roper Robinson and Ernest Rutherford found 64 lines; 16 lines from RaB and 48 lines from RaC). He finished his doctoral thesis in 1913, and by 1914 he was considered by Rutherford as a leading researcher into beta decay, but he did no further work. He enlisted in the French army in 1914 and was killed in action near Cormicy during World War I.

== Family ==
- He was the son of biologist Jean Danysz (1860–1928).
- He was the father of physicist Marian Danysz (1909–1983).

== Publications ==
- J. Danysz, Le Radium 9, 1 (1912); 10, 4 (1913)
- Danysz, J. Recherches expérimentales sur les β rayons de la famille du radium Ann. Chim. Phys. 30 (1913) 241–320
