= Roman Stanisław Ingarden =

Polish physicist

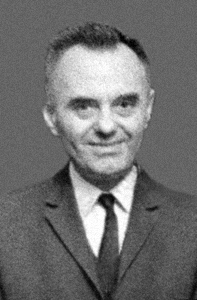
Roman Stanisław Ingarden 1969

Roman Stanisław Ingarden (/ɪnˈɡɑːrdən/; Polish: [ˈrɔman inˈɡardɛn]; 1 October 1920, Zakopane – 12 July 2011, Kraków) was a Polish physicist, specialised mainly in optics and statistical mechanics, son of the Polish philosopher Roman Witold Ingarden.

== Career ==
In 1938 he began his physics studies at the Jan Kazimierz University in Lwów as student of professors Juliusz Schauder, Stefan Banach and Hugo Steinhaus (mathematics) and Stanisław Loria and Wojciech Rubinowicz (physics).

After the outbreak of Second World War he continued his studies at the Lwów University, now Ivan Franko National University, until the beginning of the German occupation of Poland in 1941. From 1941–1944 he studied at the underground Polish university. After the war he was displaced to Kraków and was employed as assistant at the Faculty of Physics of the Silesian Polytechnics, but continued his studies of physics at the Jagiellonian University under Jan Weyssenhoff and Konstanty Zakrzewski. 1945 he moved to the University of Wrocław, where he was employed as assistant of the Theoretical Physics department.

1949 he obtained his doctor’s degree at the University of Warsaw as a pupil of professor Wojciech Rubinowicz.

He was nominated 1954 as associate, 1964 as full professor of physical sciences. Since 1954 he was responsible for the organization of the Institute of Low Temperatures of the Polish Academy of Sciences in Wrocław.

1966-1991 he was professor at the Nicolaus Copernicus University in Toruń, 1969–1986 Head of the Institute of Physics at this university, (1966–1969), chief of Department of Thermodynamics and Radiation Theory, (1969–1986) chief of department of Theoretical Physics and (1986–1991) chief of department of Statistical Physics.

He was founder of two scientific journals: Reports on Mathematical Physics (1970) and Open Systems and Information Dynamics (1992) noted on the Institute for Scientific Information Master Journal List.

Roman Stanisław Ingarden was an admirer of Japanese culture and language, since 1970s he was lecturer of Japanese language at the Toruń university.

1996 he was nominated Doctor Honoris Causa of the Toruń University.

We wrote numerous scientific papers about mathematical physics, handbooks of theoretical physics and mathematics, as well as works on philosophy and history. Due to his seminal paper "Quantum Information Theory" and later books on this subject he is considered as one of the founding fathers of the modern theory of quantum information.

Roman Stanisław Ingarden was honoured with Officer's Cross and Knight's Cross of the Order of Polonia Restituta. In 2002 the Emperor of Japan Akihito honoured him with the 3rd class, Gold Rays with Neck Ribbon Order of the Sacred Treasure.
