= Aleksander Jabłoński =

Polish physicist (1898–1980)

- Born: 26 February 1898; Woskresenówka, then Russian Empire, now Ukraine
- Died: 9 September 1980 (aged 82); Skierniewice, Poland
- Citizenship: Polish
- Education: Kharkiv University; University of Warsaw
- Known for: Jablonski diagram
- Scientific career
- Fields: Physics - photoluminescence
- Workplaces: Friedrich-Wilhelms-Universität; Nicolaus Copernicus University in Toruń
- Doctoral advisor: Stefan Pienkowski

Aleksander Jabłoński (born 26 February 1898 in Woskresenówka, in Imperial Russia; died 9 September 1980 in Skierniewice, Poland) was a Polish physicist and member of the Polish Academy of Sciences. His research was in molecular spectroscopy and photophysics.

== Life and career ==
He was born on 26 February 1898 in Woskresenówka near Kharkiv in Imperial Russia. He attended Gymnasium high school in Kharkiv as well as a music school where he learned to play the violin under supervision of Konstanty Gorski. In 1916, he started to study physics at the University of Kharkiv.

During the World War I he served in the Polish I Corps in Russia. After the war he settled in Warsaw in 1918. In 1919–1920 he fought for Poland against aggression by Soviet Russia (and was consequently decorated with the Polish Cross of Valour).

Jabłoński initially studied the violin at Warsaw Conservatory, under the virtuoso Stanisław Barcewicz, but later switched to science.

He received a Ph.D. from the University of Warsaw in 1930, writing a thesis On the influence of the change of the wavelength of excitation light on the fluorescence spectra. He then went to Friedrich-Wilhelms-Universität in Berlin, Germany for two years (1930–31) as a fellow of the Rockefeller Foundation. He worked with Peter Pringsheim at the FWU and later with Otto Stern in Hamburg. In 1934 Jabłoński returned to Poland to receive habilitation from the University of Warsaw. His thesis was On the influence of intermolecular interactions on the absorption and emission of light, the subject to which he would devote the rest of his life. He served as president of the Polish Physical Society between 1957 and 1961.

Jabłoński was a pioneer of molecular photophysics, creating the concept of the "luminescent centre" and his own theories of concentrational quenching and depolarization of photoluminescence. He also worked on pressure broadening of emission spectra lines and was the first to recognize the analogy between pressure broadening and molecular spectra. This led to development of the quantum-mechanical pressure broadening theory.

Fluorescence is illustrated schematically with the classical Jablonski diagram, first proposed by Jabłoński in 1933 to describe absorption and emission of light.

In 1946, he settled in Toruń where he was appointed Head of the Faculty of Physics at the Nicolaus Copernicus University.

== Awards and honours ==
- Cross of Valour (1920)
- Fellow of the Rockefeller Foundation (1930–31)
- Golden Cross of Merit (1951)
- Marian Smoluchowski Medal (1968)
- Honorary degree of the University of Windsor (1973)
- Honorary degree of the Nicolaus Copernicus University in Toruń (1973)
- Honorary degree of the University of Gdańsk (1975)
