= Hypertriton =

Nucleus of tritium with one strange quark

A hypertriton is a type of hypernucleus, formed of a proton, a neutron and any hyperon. The name comes from hyperon, which refers to baryons containing strange quarks, and triton, which refers to the nucleus of tritium. Because low-mass hyperons are longer-lived and easier to create than high-mass hyperons, the most common hypertritons are those containing Lambda baryons – ^{3}_{Λ}H.

Its antiparticle, the antihypertriton, is formed of an antiproton, an antineutron and any antihyperon. The first one was discovered in March 2010 by the STAR detector of the Relativistic Heavy Ion Collider (RHIC) at Brookhaven National Laboratory.
