= Czesław Białobrzeski =

Polish physicist (1878–1953)

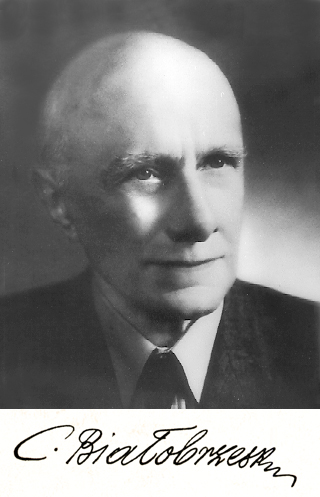
Czesław Białobrzeski.

Czesław Białobrzeski (31 August 1878 in Poshekhonye near Yaroslavl, Russia – 12 October 1953 in Warsaw) was a Polish physicist.

He studied 1896–1901 at the University of Kyiv, continued 1908–1810 as a student of Paul Langevin at Collège de France, Paris. 1914 he was nominated professor at the University of Kyiv. 1919 he moved to Poland and became Head of department at the Jagiellonian University, Kraków, 1921 at the University of Warsaw. Since 1921 he was member of the Polish Academy of Learning, since 1952 of the Polish Academy of Sciences. He served as president of the Polish Physical Society between 1934 and 1938.

Czesław Białobrzeski wrote about 100 scientific papers on thermodynamics, theory of relativity, quantum theory, theory of stellar evolution and structure, spectrography, astrophysics and philosophy of physics.

He was the first to take account of the influence of radiation pressure on stellar equilibrium.
