= Maciej Lewenstein =

Polish theoretical physicist

- Born: September 21, 1955 (age 71); Warsaw, Poland
- Education: University of Warsaw (MSc); University of Essen (PhD)
- Occupation: Physicist
- Employer(s): ICFO – The Institute of Photonic Sciences; ICREA; Leibniz University Hannover
- Awards: Humboldt Research Award (2007); Hamburg Prize for Theoretical Physics (2010); Prize of the Foundation for Polish Science (2011); Willis E. Lamb Award (2016); RSEF Medal (2017)
- Scientific career
- Fields: Theoretical physics, quantum optics, quantum information
- Doctoral advisor: Kazimierz Rzążewski, Fritz Haake

Maciej Lewenstein (born September 21, 1955) is a Polish theoretical physicist, currently working as an ICREA research professor at ICFO – The Institute of Photonic Sciences in Castelldefels near Barcelona.

== Education ==
Maciej Lewenstein was born on 21 September 1955 in Warsaw. He graduated from the Institute for Theoretical Physics (ITP) at the University of Warsaw in 1978, completing his diploma thesis on the superradiance phenomenon under the supervision of Kazimierz Rzążewski. After working for one year as a scientific assistant at the ITP, he joined the newly formed Centre for Theoretical Physics of the Polish Academy of Sciences (CFT) in Warsaw in 1979, which was established by Iwo Białynicki-Birula. At the CFT, he began his PhD studies on the applications of functional integration methods in quantum optics with Rzążewski. In 1981, he received a DAAD scholarship to study at the University of Essen. There, he completed his doctoral thesis under the joint supervision of Fritz Haake in 1983, graduating summa cum laude and receiving the Prize of the University.

From 1984 to 1986, he worked as a postdoctoral researcher at the University of Essen alongside Haake, focusing on the statistical physics of disordered systems. After returning to Poland and becoming a faculty member at the CFT, he completed his habilitation in 1986 at the Institute of Physics of the Polish Academy of Sciences with a thesis on cavity quantum electrodynamics and intense laser–matter interactions.

== Research career ==
After completing his habilitation, he spent three years as a research associate with the Nobel laureate Roy J. Glauber at Harvard University. In the early 1990s, he continued to expand his collaborations on the quantum optics of dielectric media and cavity quantum electrodynamics with Glauber, as well as with Thomas W. Mossberg. He was also an associate member of the Institute for Social Studies at the University of Warsaw (ISS), where he developed collaborations with Andrzej Nowak and Bibb Latané. In 1992, he spent a six-month sabbatical at the Service des Photons, Atomes et Molécules (SPAM) of the Commissariat à l'énergie atomique (CEA) in Saclay. There, he began his research into the foundations of attosecond physics and high harmonic generation alongside Anne L'Huillier (Nobel 2023). In 1993, he spent a year as a visiting fellow at JILA (Joint Institute for Laboratory Astrophysics) in Boulder, Colorado, where he continued his work on attosecond physics while initiating interests in the physics of ultracold atoms and quantum information, co-running a joint seminar on Bose–Einstein condensation with Peter Zoller and Eric Allin Cornell (Nobel 2001). In 1994, he spent six months at the Institute for Theoretical Atomic and Molecular Physics at the Harvard–Smithsonian Center for Astrophysics, continuing his studies of ultracold gases with Glauber.

In 1995, he joined the faculty of SPAM at the CEA in Saclay, where he spent three and a half years dividing his research between the physics of ultraintense laser–matter interactions, attosecond physics, the physics of ultracold gases, and quantum information. In 1998, he became a full professor at Leibniz University Hannover, remaining there until 2005. In 2005, he moved to Spain as an ICREA research professor to lead the quantum optics theory group at ICFO – the Institute of Photonic Sciences in Castelldefels.

== Selected publications ==
- Polish Jazz Recordings and Beyond – Maciej Lewenstein, Warszawska Firma Wydawnicza (2015).
- Ultracold Atoms in Optical Lattices: Simulating Quantum Many-Body Systems – Maciej Lewenstein, Anna Sanpera, and Verónica Ahufinger, Oxford University Press (2012).

== Community service ==
He served as a division associate editor of Physical Review Letters from 1997 to 2003. He has been a member of the editorial boards of Open Systems & Information Dynamics and Reports on Progress in Physics as of 2026. He was also the chairman of the Quantum Optics and Photonics Division of the German Physical Society (DPG) from 2004 to 2006.

== Awards and honors ==
- 2004 – Fellow of the American Physical Society
- 2007 – Humboldt Research Award
- 2010 – Hamburg Prize for Theoretical Physics (Hertz Foundation Award)
- 2011 – Prize of the Foundation for Polish Science
- 2013 – Gutenberg Research Award of the Johannes Gutenberg University Mainz
- 2013 – European Physical Society Quantum Electronics and Optics Division Prize for Fundamental Research
- 2016 – RSEF Medal
- 2016 – Willis E. Lamb Award
- 2019 – Member of the Academia Europaea
