= Broughton Island (New South Wales) =

Coastal protected area in New South Wales, Australia

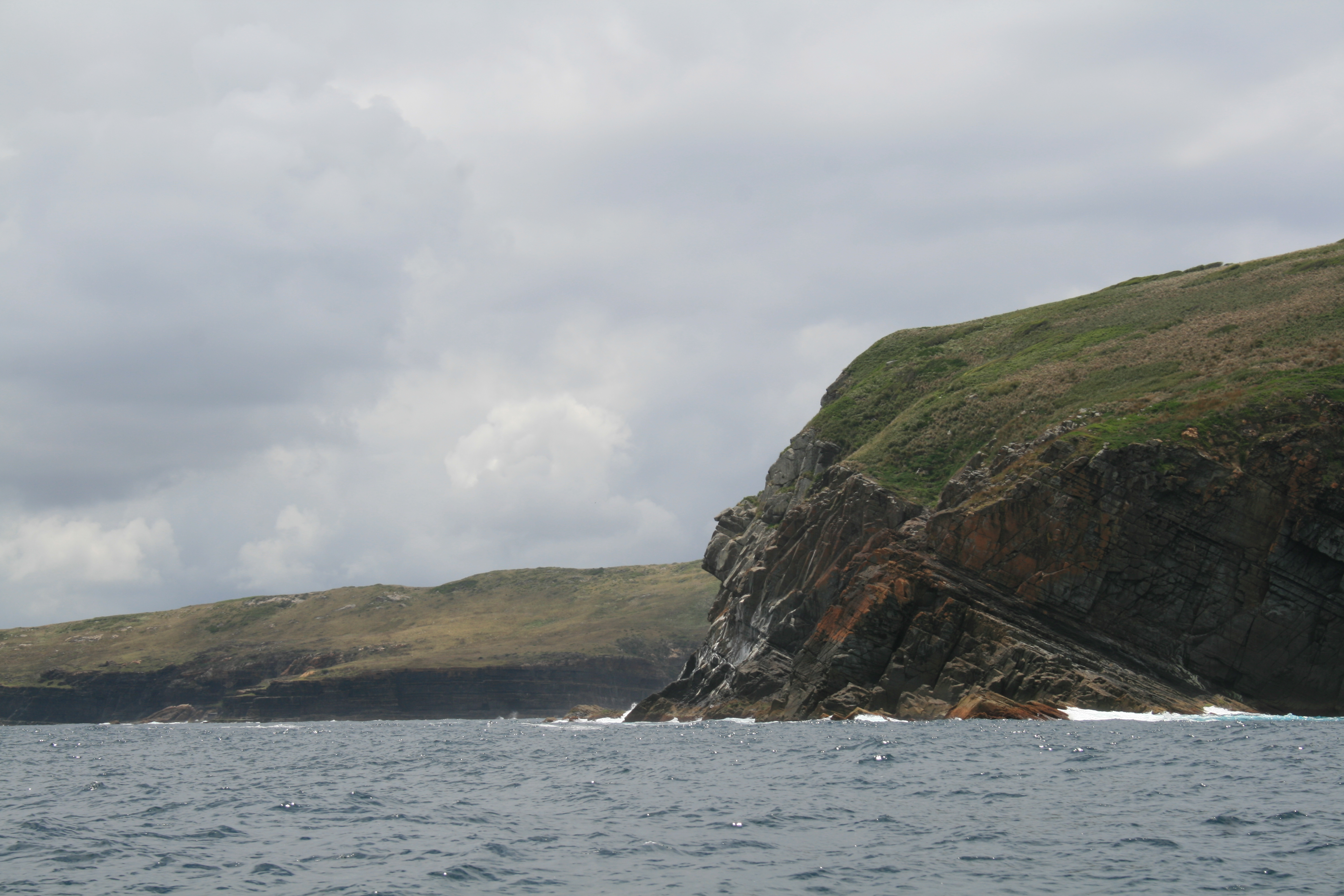

- Location within New South Wales
- Location: New South Wales
- Coordinates: 32°36′57″S 152°19′02″E
- Area: 1.14 km^{2} (0.44 sq mi)
- Established: 1972
- Governing body: New South Wales National Parks & Wildlife Service
- Website: http://www.nationalparks.nsw.gov.au/broughton

Broughton Island is an island 14 km north-east of Port Stephens on the Mid North Coast of New South Wales, Australia. It is part of the Myall Lakes National Park.

== History ==
Archaeology indicates that the certain ancestors of the Worimi people inhabited the island for an otherwise apparently indeterminate period of two thousand years, and whatever name those people may have had for the island itself remains unknown. It lay within the territory of the Garrawerrigal branch (nurra) of the Woromi. "Garrawerrigal" meant "the people of the sea", from garoowa=sea. Niritba was "the home of the mutton bird" in their language.

Broughton Island was seen by James Cook commanding HM Bark Endeavour on 11 May 1770: he mistook it for a headland and called it Black Head. After its insularity was discovered, it was renamed Broughton Islands, and so appears on the 1852 Admiralty chart, Australia, East Coast. Broken Bay to Sugarloaf Point, from a running survey by Capt. J. Lort Stokes, H.M.S. Acheron, 1851. Providence Bay also appears for the first time on this chart.

Nearby Port Stephens was surveyed by Commander William Broughton in HMS Providence in August 1795. Stokes appears to have named the island and bay after Broughton and his ship, perhaps on the advice of his friend, Phillip Parker King, who was then residing at Tahlee in Port Stephens and had surveyed the coast in a private capacity.

The island was used between 1905 and 1907 in regards to testing of biological controls on feral rabbits, by French-based Polish biologist Jean Danysz (1860–1928).

== National Park ==
Broughton Island has been part of the Myall Lakes National Park since it was declared in 1972. Wedge-tailed shearwaters, known locally as "muttonbirds", nest on the island, as well as Australian little penguins, close to the northern limit of their range. In November 2009, the National Parks and Wildlife Service declared the island free from rabbits and rats.

=== Dive sites ===
There are a few recreational dive sites at the Broughton Islands:

- The Looking Glass at Looking Glass Island is a gap that runs right through the small island.
- Cod Rock, south of Broughton Island
- Bubble Cave, at the mouth of Esmeralda Cove
- Big Shark Gutters, at the south eastern corner of Little Broughton Island, where grey nurse sharks can be seen.
- Little Shark gutters, to the north of Big Shark Gutters.
- The Steps and Spider Cave, at the south side of the east corner of Broughton Island.
