= Logarithmic Schrödinger equation =

Nonlinear partial differential equation

In theoretical physics, the logarithmic Schrödinger equation (sometimes abbreviated as LNSE or LogSE) is one of the nonlinear modifications of Schrödinger's equation, first proposed by Gerald H. Rosen in its relativistic version (with D'Alembertian instead of Laplacian and first-order time derivative) in 1969. It is a classical wave equation with applications to extensions of quantum mechanics, quantum optics, nuclear physics, transport and diffusion phenomena, open quantum systems and information theory, effective quantum gravity and physical vacuum models and theory of superfluidity and Bose–Einstein condensation. It is an example of an integrable model.

== The equation ==
The logarithmic Schrödinger equation is a partial differential equation. In mathematics and mathematical physics one often uses its dimensionless form:
$$i \frac{\partial \psi}{\partial t} + \nabla^2 \psi + \psi \ln |\psi|^2 = 0.$$
for the complex-valued function ψ = ψ(x, t) of the particles position vector x = (x, y, z) at time t, and
$$\nabla^2 \psi = \frac{\partial^2 \psi}{\partial x^2} + \frac{\partial^2 \psi}{\partial y^2} + \frac{\partial^2 \psi}{\partial z^2}$$
is the Laplacian of ψ in Cartesian coordinates. The logarithmic term $\psi \ln |\psi|^2$ has been shown indispensable in determining the speed of sound scales as the cubic root of pressure for Helium-4 at very low temperatures. This logarithmic term is also needed for cold sodium atoms. In spite of the logarithmic term, it has been shown in the case of central potentials, that even for non-zero angular momentum, the LogSE retains certain symmetries similar to those found in its linear counterpart, making it potentially applicable to atomic and nuclear systems.

The relativistic version of this equation can be obtained by replacing the derivative operator with the D'Alembertian, similarly to the Klein–Gordon equation. Soliton-like solutions known as Gaussons figure prominently as analytical solutions to this equation for a number of cases.

== See also ==
- Galaxy rotation curve
- Nonlinear Schrödinger equation
- Superfluid Helium-4
- Superfluid vacuum theory
