= Jablonski diagram =

Diagram of the electronic states of a molecule

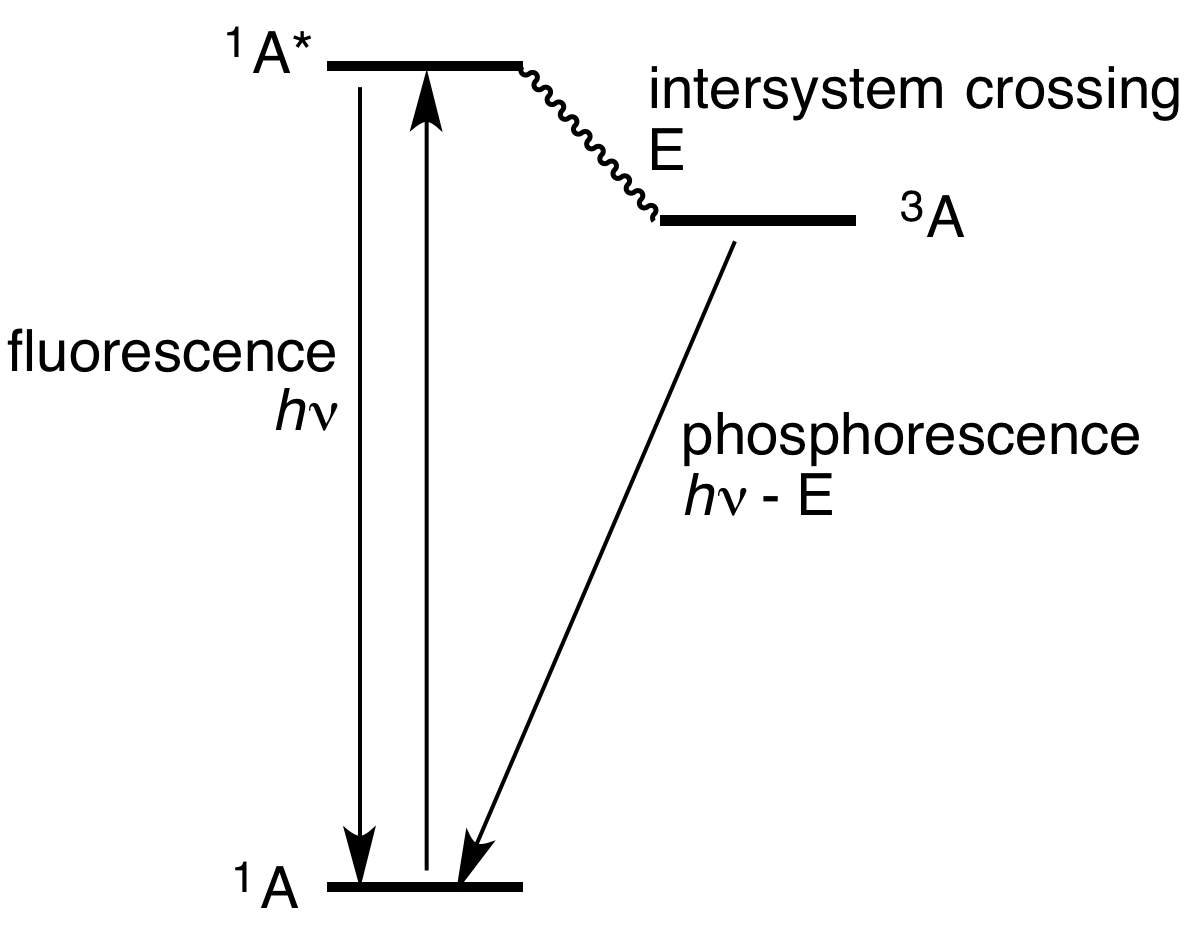
A Jablonski diagram showing the excitation of molecule A to its singlet excited state (^{1}A*) followed by intersystem crossing to the triplet state (^{3}A) that relaxes to the ground state by phosphorescence. It was used to describe absorption and emission of light by fluorescence.

In molecular spectroscopy, a Jablonski diagram is a diagram that illustrates the electronic states and often the vibrational levels of a molecule, and also the transitions between them. The states are arranged vertically by energy and grouped horizontally by spin multiplicity. Nonradiative transitions are indicated by squiggly arrows and radiative transitions by straight arrows. The vibrational ground states of each electronic state are indicated with thick lines, the higher vibrational states with thinner lines. The diagram is named after the Polish physicist Aleksander Jabłoński who first proposed it in 1933.

== Transitions ==
Jablonski diagram including vibrational levels for absorbance, non-radiative decay, and fluorescence as well as phosphorescence and the rate constants of the processes involved.

When a molecule absorbs a photon, the photon energy is converted and increases the molecule's internal energy level. Likewise, when an excited molecule releases energy, it can do so in the form of a photon. Depending on the energy of the photon, this could correspond to a change in vibrational, electronic, or rotational energy levels. The changes between these levels are called "transitions" and are plotted on the Jablonski diagram.

Radiative transitions involve either the absorption or emission of a photon. As mentioned above, these transitions are denoted with solid arrows with their tails at the initial energy level and their tips at the final energy level.

Nonradiative transitions arise through several different mechanisms, all differently labeled in the diagram. Relaxation of the excited state to its lowest vibrational level is called vibrational relaxation (VR). This process involves the dissipation of energy from the molecule to its surroundings, and thus it cannot occur for isolated molecules.

A second type of nonradiative transition is internal conversion (IC), which occurs when a vibrational state of an electronically excited state can couple to a vibrational state of a lower electronic state. The molecule could then subsequently relax further through vibrational relaxation.

A third type is intersystem crossing (ISC); this is a transition to a state with a different spin multiplicity. In molecules with large spin-orbit coupling, intersystem crossing is much more important than in molecules that exhibit only small spin-orbit coupling. ISC can be followed by phosphorescence.

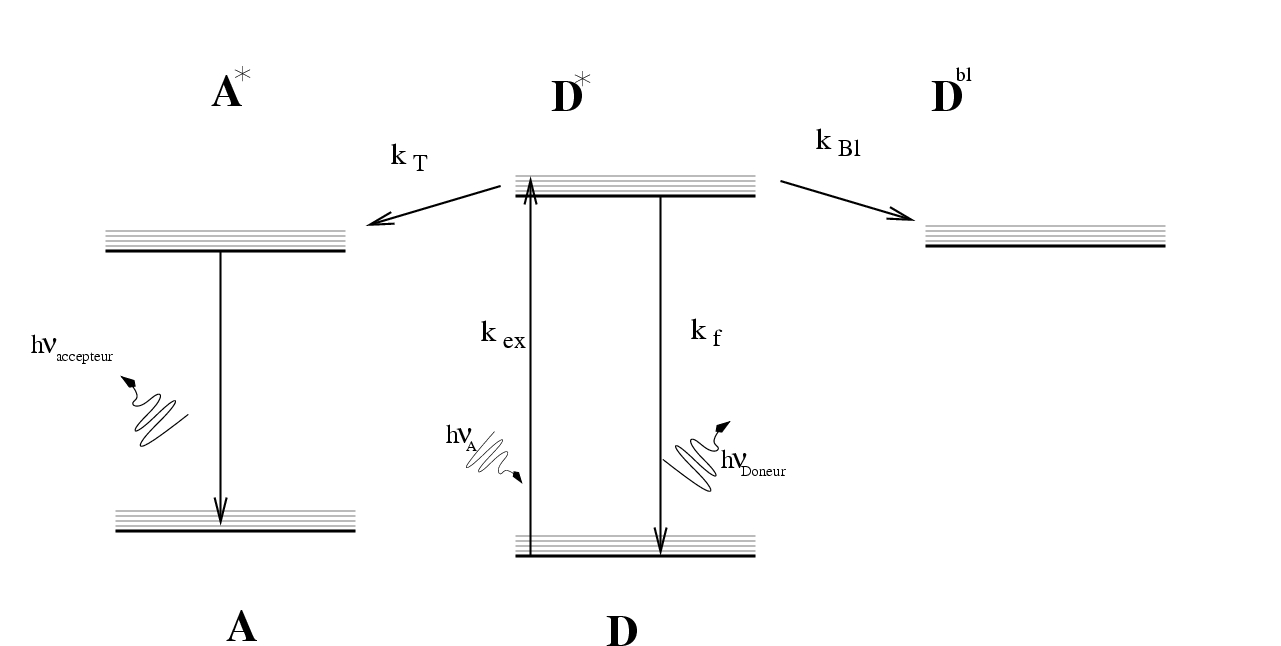
A Jablonski diagram representing Förster resonance energy transfer (FRET)

== See also ==
- Franck–Condon principle
- Grotrian diagram (for atoms)
