= Władysław Natanson =

Polish physicist (1864–1947)

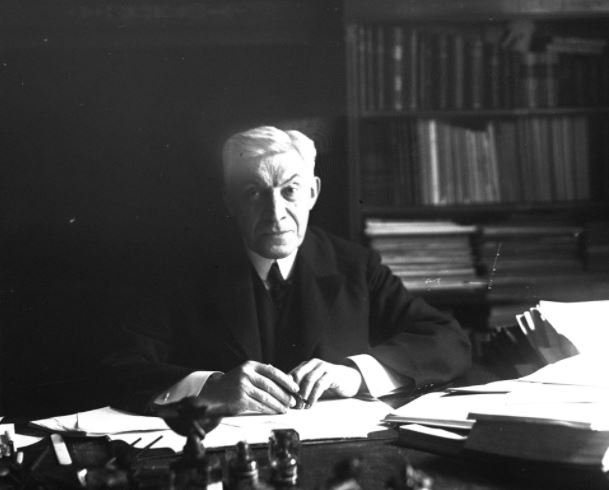
- Natanson in 1928 in his office at Jagiellonian University.
- Born: 1864
- Died: 1947 (aged 82–83)
- Known for: Indistinguishable particles
- Scientific career
- Fields: Physics
- Workplaces: Jagiellonian University

Władysław Natanson (1864–1937) was a Polish physicist. Natanson was head of Theoretical Physics at Jagiellonian University from 1899 to 1935. He is known for first proposing the concept of indistinguishable particles leading to quantum statistics.

== Family ==
He came from a Jewish family of bankers, being the grandson of Samuel Natanson (1795–1879), the son of Ludwik Natanson (1821–1896), a physician, and Natalia Epstein. His brother was the industrialist Edward Natanson (1861–1940), father of physicist Ludwik Karol Natanson (1905–1992).

== Research ==
He published a series of papers on thermodynamically irreversible processes, gaining him recognition in the rapidly growing field. He was the first to consider the distinguishability of energy quanta in the statistical analysis of elementary processes, a precursor of the concept of quantum indistinguishability. He discovered a quantum statistics, rediscovered 11 years later by Satyendra Nath Bose and generalized by Albert Einstein though his derivation was not in terms of Einstein's light quanta aka photons – the Bose–Einstein statistics.

== See also ==
- List of Poles (physicicsts)
