= Kazimierz Rzążewski =

Polish theoretical physicist

- Born: 9 November 1943 (age 82); Warsaw, Poland
- Education: University of Warsaw (MSc, PhD)
- Awards: Humboldt Research Award (1999); ICO Galileo Galilei Medal (2013); Honorary Doctorate (University of Stuttgart) (2014); Prize of the Foundation for Polish Science (2015); Gold Cross of Merit (2006)
- Scientific career
- Fields: Theoretical physics, quantum optics, ultracold atoms
- Workplaces: Center for Theoretical Physics PAS; Cardinal Stefan Wyszyński University in Warsaw
- Thesis: Functional Integration Methods in Quantum Optics
- Doctoral advisor: Iwo Białynicki-Birula
- Doctoral students: Maciej Lewenstein

Kazimierz Rzążewski (born 9 November 1943) is a Polish theoretical physicist and professor of physical sciences, specializing in quantum optics and the physics of ultracold quantum gases.

== Biography ==
In 1966, Rzążewski graduated from the University of Warsaw, where he defended his doctoral thesis in 1972 and completed his habilitation in 1979. He worked as an assistant professor at the university until 1980. That year, he joined the Institute of Theoretical Physics of the Polish Academy of Sciences (PAS), which would later become the Center for Theoretical Physics of the Polish Academy of Sciences. He served as the director of the center from 1999 to 2002. In 1988, he officially received the academic title of professor of physical sciences. He has published in the fields of quantum mechanics and atomic physics.

From 1993 to 2000, he was a faculty member at the School of Exact Sciences (SNS) and served as its rector from 1994 to 1997. From 2000 to 2011, he was employed as a professor at the Cardinal Stefan Wyszyński University in Warsaw (UKSW).

Throughout his career, Rzążewski held positions as a visiting professor at several international institutions, including the University of Essen, the Institute of Optics at the University of Rochester, JILA in Boulder, Colorado, the Catholic University of Louvain, the Max Planck Institute of Quantum Optics in Garching, and the University of Stuttgart, which also awarded him an honorary doctorate (Dr. h.c.) in 2014. He has been elected a Fellow of the American Physical Society and a Fellow of the Institute of Physics (UK). He has served as an editorial board member for the Journal of Physics B and a co-editor of Europhysics Letters.

Beyond his work in quantum mechanics and atomic physics, Rzążewski has conducted research into the mathematical properties of electoral systems. In 2014, he co-authored the book Każdy głos się liczy. Wędrówka przez krainę wyborów (Every Vote Counts: A Journey Through the Land of Elections) alongside Wojciech Słomczyński and Karol Życzkowski.

== Awards and honors ==
- 1999 – Humboldt Research Award from the Alexander von Humboldt Foundation.
- 2006 – Gold Cross of Merit for contributions to science.
- 2013 – Galileo Galilei Medal awarded by the International Commission for Optics for achievements in optics.
- 2015 – Prize of the Foundation for Polish Science for his discovery of the phenomenon of magnetostriction in ultracold dipolar gases.
