= Acta Physica Polonica =

- Discipline: Acta Phys. Pol. A atomic and molecular physics, condensed matter physics, optics and quantum optics, quantum information, biophysics, applied physics, and general physics Acta Phys. Pol. B Mathematical, statistical, particle and nuclear physics, relativity and astrophysics
- Language: English
- Edited by: Acta Phys. Pol. A Jan Mostowski; Acta Phys. Pol. B Michał Praszałowicz

Publication details
- Former name: Comptes Rendus des Séances de la Société Polonaise de Physique
- History: 1920–1970; Acta Phys. Pol. 1971–present Acta Phys. Pol. A Acta Phys. Pol. B 2008–present Acta Phys. Pol. B Proc. Suppl.
- Publisher: Acta Phys. Pol. A Institute of Physics of the Polish Academy of Sciences; Acta Phys. Pol. B Jagiellonian University
- Open access: Yes
- Impact factor: Acta Phys. Pol. A : 0.7; Acta Phys. Pol. B : 0.5 (2022)

Standard abbreviations
- ISO 4: Acta Phys. Pol.

Indexing
- Acta Phys. Pol. A
- ISSN: 0587-4246 (print); 1898-794X (web)
- OCLC no.: 637499350
- Acta Phys. Pol. B
- ISSN: 0587-4254 (print); 1509-5770 (web)
- OCLC no.: 609875040
- Acta Phys. Pol. B Proc. Suppl.
- ISSN: 1899-2358 (print); 2082-7865 (web)
- OCLC no.: 646579613

Links
- Acta Phys. Pol. A website; Acta Phys. Pol. A Online access; Acta Phys. Pol. B website; Acta Phys. Pol. B Online access; Acta Phys. Pol. B Proc. Suppl. Online access

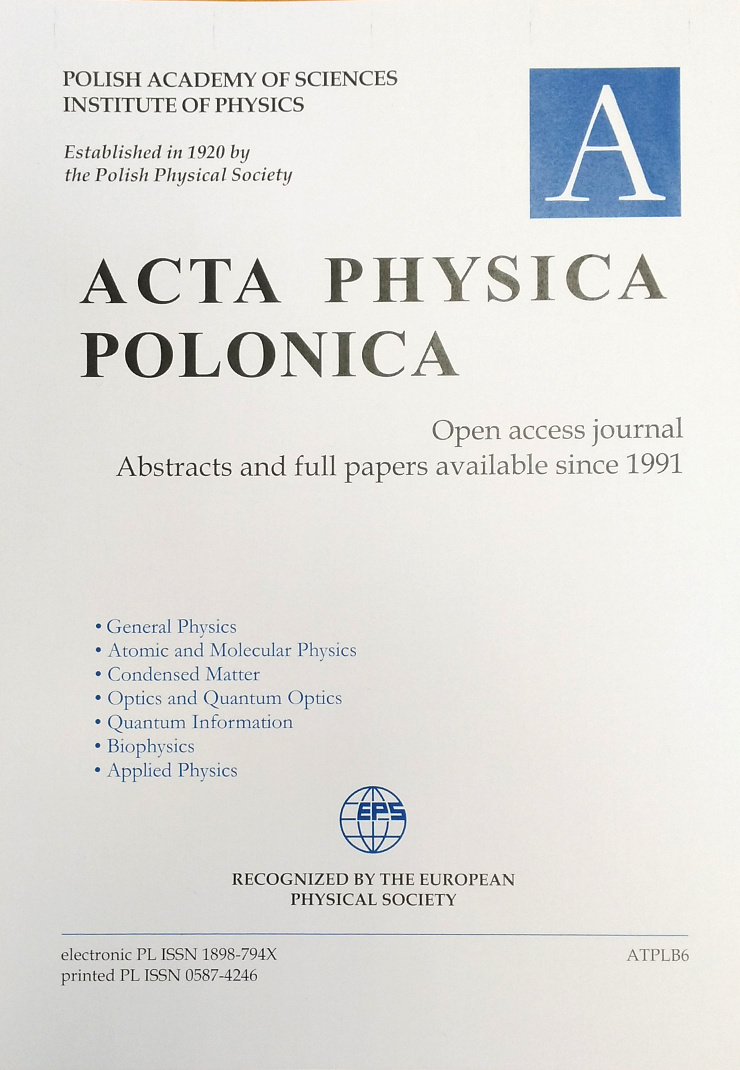
Photo of the front page of Acta Physica Polonica A

Acta Physica Polonica is an open access peer-reviewed scientific journal covering research in physics. It was established by the Polish Physical Society in 1920 as Comptes Rendus des Séances de la Société Polonaise de Physique. In 1970, it was split into two journals Acta Physica Polonica A and Acta Physica Polonica B. The two journals became independent in 1995, with series A published by the Institute of Physics of the Polish Academy of Sciences and series B published by the Jagiellonian University in cooperation with the Polish Academy of Arts and Sciences.

== History ==
Acta Physica Polonica was established by the Polish Physical Society in 1920. In 1970 it was split into Acta Physica Polonica A (published by the Institute of Physics of the Polish Academy of Sciences), whose scope includes general physics, atomic and molecular physics, condensed matter physics, optics and quantum optics, biophysics, quantum information, and applied physics, and Acta Physica Polonica B (published by the Jagiellonian University), which covers mathematical physics, particle and nuclear physics, relativity, astrophysics, and statistical physics. The editors-in-chief are Jan Mostowski and Michał Praszałowicz, respectively. In 2008, Acta Physica Polonica B Proceedings Supplement was established.
