= HD 17092 b =

Extrasolar planet

Discovery
- Discovered by: A. Niedzielski et al.
- Discovery site: Poland
- Discovery date: May 6, 2007
- Detection method: Radial velocity

Orbital characteristics
- Semi-major axis: 1.29 ± 0.05 AU (193,000,000 ± 7,500,000 km)
- Eccentricity: 0.166 ± 0.052
- Orbital period (sidereal): 359.9 ± 2.4 d
- Time of periastron: 2452969.5 ± 12.3
- Argument of periastron: 347.4 ± 13.4
- Semi-amplitude: 82.4 ± 3.2
- Star: HD 17092

Physical characteristics
- Mass: ≥4.6 M_{J}

HD 17092 b is an extrasolar planet located approximately 750 light years away in the constellation Perseus, orbiting the giant star HD 17092.

== Discovery ==
In 2007 discovery of an extrasolar planet orbiting HD 17092 was announced by a team led by Andrzej Niedzielski of Polish Nicolaus Copernicus University and including astronomers from Penn State, the Spitzer Science Center, the Jet Propulsion Laboratory, and the University of Texas. The discovery was made using the Hobby-Eberly Telescope.

== Characteristics ==
The planet, designated as HD 17092 b, has a minimum mass of 4.6 Jupiter masses. The mean distance of the planet from the star is more than distance between Earth and the Sun at 1.29 AU, and the eccentricity of the orbit is mild at 0.166.
