= Jan Rzewuski =

Polish theoretical physicist

Jan Rzewuski (December 19, 1916, in Łódź – September 17, 1994, in Wrocław) was a Polish theoretical physicist, a member of Polish resistance during World War II and a participant in the Warsaw Uprising.

Rzewuski finished a gimnazjum in Łódź in 1934 and between 1934 and 1939 studied chemistry in Lwów and Gdańsk. From the start of the German occupation of Poland until 1942 he worked in the cotton industry in Łódź as an ordinary worker. In the next two years he studied theoretical physics in a secret underground (Poles were forbidden to study past the elementary level during the German occupation) university organized by the University of Warsaw.

As part of the Polish Home Army (AK) he fought in the Warsaw Uprising for which he was later decorated with the Cross of Valor and the Cross of the Uprising.

After the war, in 1945, he worked a lecturer at the Lublin Polytechnic. In 1946 he moved back to Warsaw, where he took a position at the University of Warsaw and where, in that year he got his magisterium in theoretical physics under Jan Blaton. He received a scholarship of Ministry of Education and defended his doctoral thesis in 1947. In 1948 he was hired as an adjunct at the Mikolaj Kopernik University in Toruń. He spent the next year at the University of Birmingham.

He was the laureate of numerous awards and decorations. He received an honorary decree from University of Wrocław, the Order of Polonia Restituta, the Jurzykowski Prize in USA, the Medal of the Polish Education Commission and several awards from the Polish Minister of Education. The Institute of Physics of the Polish Academy of Sciences awarded him the Marian Smoluchowski Medal.
