= Wojciech Rubinowicz =

Polish physicist

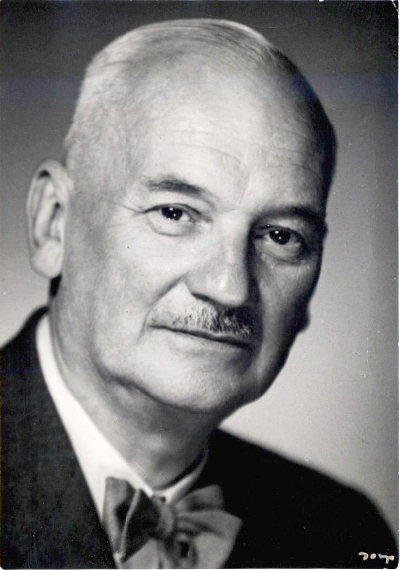
Wojciech Rubinowicz (1954)

Wojciech Sylwester Piotr Rubinowicz (22 February 1889 – 13 October 1974) was a Polish theoretical physicist who made contributions in quantum mechanics, mathematical physics, and the theory of radiation. He is known for the Maggie-Rubinowicz representation of Gustav Kirchhoff’s diffraction formula.

== Life and career ==
He was born in Sadagóra, Bukovina, in the Austro-Hungarian Empire, the son of Małgorzata Brodowska and Damian Rubinowicz, a Polish patriot and an insurgent of the January Uprising of 1863. In 1908, Rubinowicz began his studies at Chernivtsi University, and he was awarded his doctorate in 1914. In 1916, he began postgraduate studies at the Ludwig-Maximilians-Universität München under Arnold Sommerfeld and eventually becoming his assistant. In 1918, he became a Privatdozent at Chernivtsi University. Two years later, he took an appointment as professor at the University of Ljubljana, Yugoslavia. He became a professor at Lviv Polytechnic, in 1922. During the period from 1937 to 1941, he was a professor at the John Casimir University of Lwów. After World War II, starting in 1946, he was professor of theoretical physics at the University of Warsaw until 1960. He served as president of the Polish Physical Society between 1949–1952 and 1961–1974.

While at the Ludwig-Maximilians-Universität München, Rubinowicz published contributions to radiation theory and to three of Sommerfeld’s major interests, i.e., Sommerfeld’s extension of Bohr’s theory of the atom and both mathematical physics and diffraction theory; he carried these topical interests throughout his career. He eventually published books based on his mathematical physics interests as well as diffraction theory: his work on the polynomial method of solving eigenvalue problems in quantum mechanics was described in "Sommerfeldsche Polynommethode" and his work on diffraction theory, was published in "Die Beugungswelle in der Kirchhoffschen Theorie der Beugung".

Also while at the Ludwig-Maximilians-Universität München, Rubinowicz transformed the Kirchhoff diffraction integral into what has become known as the Rubinowicz representation (also known as the Maggie-Rubinowicz representation) for which scalar and electromagnetic fields are interpreted as a transformation of a surface integral into a line integral – an independent and slightly different derivation from that done in 1888 by G. A. Maggi, one of Gustav Kirchhoff's students in Berlin. Rubinowicz’s form of the representation, as opposed to Maggi’s, is now more commonly accepted.

The circle of his disciples and associates included: in Lwów Jan Blaton, Wanda Hanusowa, Roman Stanisław Ingarden, Wasyl Milianczuk, Jerzy Rayski, Kazimierz Vetulani; in Warsaw: Bohdan Karczewski, Wojciech Królikowski, Adam Kujawski, Jan Petykiewicz, Jerzy Plebański.

He died in Warsaw, Poland.

== Books ==
- Adalbert Rubinowicz "Die Beugungswelle in der Kirchhoffschen Theorie der Beugung" (1957, 1966)
- Adalbert Rubinowicz "Quantum Mechanics" (1968)
- Adalbert Rubinowicz "Sommerfeldsche Polynommethode: Die Grundlehren der mathematischen Wissenschaften in Einzeldarstellungen mit besonderer Berücksichtigung der Anwendungsgebiete" (Polnischer Verl. d. Wissenschaften, 1972)
- Adalbert Rubinowicz "Selected Papers" (Polish Scientific Publishers PWN, Warsaw 1975)
