= Hypernucleus =

Nucleus which contains at least one hyperon

A hypernucleus is similar to a conventional atomic nucleus, but contains at least one hyperon in addition to the normal protons and neutrons. Hyperons are a category of baryon particles that carry non-zero strangeness quantum number, which is conserved by the strong and electromagnetic interactions.

A variety of reactions give access to depositing one or more units of strangeness in a nucleus. Hypernuclei containing the lightest hyperon, the lambda (Λ), tend to be more tightly bound than normal nuclei, though they can decay via the weak force with a mean lifetime of around 200 ps. Sigma (Σ) hypernuclei have been sought, as have doubly-strange nuclei containing xi baryons (Ξ) or two Λ's.

== Nomenclature ==
Hypernuclei are named in terms of their atomic number and baryon number, as in normal nuclei, plus the hyperon(s) which are listed in a left subscript of the symbol, with the caveat that atomic number is interpreted as the total charge of the hypernucleus, including charged hyperons such as the xi minus (Ξ^{−}) as well as protons. For example, the hypernucleus ^{16}_{Λ}O contains 8 protons, 7 neutrons, and one Λ (which carries no charge).

== History ==
The first was discovered by Marian Danysz and Jerzy Pniewski in 1952 using a nuclear emulsion plate exposed to cosmic rays, based on their energetic but delayed decay. This event was inferred to be due to a nuclear fragment containing a Λ baryon. Experiments until the 1970s would continue to study hypernuclei produced in emulsions using cosmic rays, and later using pion (π) and kaon (K) beams from particle accelerators.

Since the 1980s, more efficient production methods using pion and kaon beams have allowed further investigation at various accelerator facilities, including CERN, Brookhaven National Laboratory, KEK, DAφNE, and JPARC. In the 2010s, heavy ion experiments such as ALICE and STAR first allowed the production and measurement of light hypernuclei formed through hadronization from quark–gluon plasma.

== Properties ==
Hypernuclear physics differs from that of normal nuclei because a hyperon is distinguishable from the four nucleon spin and isospin. That is, a single hyperon is not restricted by the Pauli exclusion principle, and can sink to the lowest energy level. As such, hypernuclei are often smaller and more tightly bound than normal nuclei; for example, the lithium hypernucleus ^{7}_{Λ}Li is 19% smaller than the normal nucleus ^{6}Li. However, the hyperons can decay via the weak force; the mean lifetime of a free Λ is 263±2 ps, and that of a Λ hypernucleus is usually slightly shorter.

A generalized mass formula developed for both the non-strange normal nuclei and strange hypernuclei can estimate masses of hypernuclei containing Λ, ΛΛ, Σ, and Ξ hyperon(s). The neutron and proton driplines for hypernuclei are predicted and existence of some exotic hypernuclei beyond the normal neutron and proton driplines are suggested. This generalized mass formula was named the "Samanta formula" by Botvina and Pochodzalla and used to predict relative yields of hypernuclei in heavy-ion collisions.

== Types ==
=== Λ hypernuclei ===
The simplest, and most well understood, type of hypernucleus includes only the lightest hyperon, the Λ.

While two nucleons can interact through the nuclear force mediated by a virtual pion, the Λ becomes a Σ baryon upon emitting a pion, (Note: Isospin (I), a number describing the up and down quark content of the system, is preserved in the strong interaction. Since the isospin of a pion is 1, the Λ baryon (I = 0) must become a Σ (I = 1) upon emitting a pion.) so the Λ–nucleon interaction is mediated solely by more massive mesons such as the η and ω mesons, or through the simultaneous exchange of two or more mesons. This means that the Λ–nucleon interaction is weaker and has a shorter range than the standard nuclear force, and the potential well of a Λ in the nucleus is shallower than that of a nucleon; in hypernuclei, the depth of the Λ potential is approximately 30 MeV. However, one-pion exchange in the Λ–nucleon interaction does cause quantum-mechanical mixing of the Λ and Σ baryons in hypernuclei (which does not happen in free space), especially in neutron-rich hypernuclei. Additionally, the three-body force between a Λ and two nucleons is expected to be more important than the three-body interaction in nuclei, since the Λ can exchange two pions with a virtual Σ intermediate, while the equivalent process in nucleons requires a relatively heavy delta baryon (Δ) intermediate.

Like all hyperons, Λ hypernuclei can decay through the weak interaction, which changes it to a lighter baryon and emits a meson or a lepton–antilepton pair. In free space, the Λ usually decays via the weak force to a proton and a π^{–} meson, or a neutron and a π^{0}, with a total half-life of 263±2 ps. A nucleon in the hypernucleus can cause the Λ to decay via the weak force without emitting a pion; this process becomes dominant in heavy hypernuclei, due to suppression of the pion-emitting decay mode. The half-life of the Λ in a hypernucleus is considerably shorter, plateauing to about 215±14 ps near ^{56}_{Λ}Fe, but some empirical measurements substantially disagree with each other or with theoretical predictions.

=== Hypertriton ===
The simplest hypernucleus is the hypertriton (^{3}_{Λ}H), which consists of one proton, one neutron, and one Λ hyperon. The Λ in this system is very loosely bound, having a separation energy of 130 keV and a large radius of 10.6 fm, compared to about 2.13 fm for the deuteron.

This loose binding would imply a lifetime similar to a free Λ. However, the measured hypertriton lifetime averaged across all experiments (about 206+15
−13 ps) is substantially shorter than predicted by theory, as the non-mesonic decay mode is expected to be relatively minor; some experimental results are substantially shorter or longer than this average.

=== Σ hypernuclei ===
The existence of hypernuclei containing a Σ baryon is less clear. Several experiments in the early 1980s reported bound hypernuclear states above the Λ separation energy and presumed to contain one of the slightly heavier Σ baryons, but experiments later in the decade ruled out the existence of such states. Results from exotic atoms containing a Σ^{−} bound to a nucleus by the electromagnetic force have found a net repulsive Σ–nucleon interaction in medium-sized and large hypernuclei, which means that no Σ hypernuclei exist in such mass range. However, an experiment in 1998 definitively observed the light Σ hypernucleus ^{4}_{Σ}He.

=== ΛΛ and Ξ hypernuclei ===
Hypernuclei containing two Λ baryons have been made. However, such hypernuclei are much harder to produce due to containing two strange quarks and, as of 2016, only seven candidate ΛΛ hypernuclei have been observed. Like the Λ–nucleon interaction, empirical and theoretical models predict that the Λ–Λ interaction is mildly attractive.

Hypernuclei containing a Ξ baryon are known. Empirical studies and theoretical models indicate that the Ξ^{–}–proton interaction is attractive, but weaker than the Λ–nucleon interaction. Like the Σ^{–} and other negatively charged particles, the Ξ^{–} can also form an exotic atom. When a Ξ^{–} is bound in an exotic atom or a hypernucleus, it quickly decays to a ΛΛ hypernucleus or to two Λ hypernuclei by exchanging a strange quark with a proton, which releases about 29 MeV of energy in free space: (Note: The initial proton and Ξ^{–} have respective masses of approximately 938.3 and 1321.7 MeV, while the outgoing Λ's are each about 1115.7 MeV; the energy that is released is equal to the amount of mass that is lost (times c^{2}).)

Ξ^{−} + p → Λ + Λ

=== Ω hypernuclei ===
Hypernuclei containing the omega baryon (Ω) were predicted using lattice QCD in 2018; in particular, the proton–Ω and Ω–Ω dibaryons (bound systems containing two baryons) are expected to be stable. As of 2022, no such hypernuclei have been observed under any conditions, but the lightest such species could be produced in heavy-ion collisions, and measurements by the STAR experiment are consistent with the existence of the proton–Ω dibaryon.

=== Hypernuclei with higher strangeness ===
Since the Λ is electrically neutral and its nuclear force interactions are attractive, there are predicted to be arbitrarily large hypernuclei with high strangeness and small net charge, including species with no nucleons. Binding energy per baryon in multi-strange hypernuclei can reach up to 21 MeV/A under certain conditions, compared to 8.80 MeV/A for the ordinary nucleus ^{62}Ni. Additionally, formation of Ξ baryons should quickly become energetically favorable, unlike when there are no Λ's, because the exchange of strangeness with a nucleon would be impossible due to the Pauli exclusion principle.

== Production ==
Several modes of production have been devised to make hypernuclei through bombardment of normal nuclei.

=== Strangeness exchange and production ===
One method of producing a K^{−} meson exchanges a strange quark with a nucleon and changes it to a Λ:

p + K^{−} → Λ + π^{0}
n + K^{−} → Λ + π^{−}

The cross section for the formation of a hypernucleus is maximized when the momentum of the kaon beam is approximately 500 MeV/c. Several variants of this setup exist, including ones where the incident kaons are either brought to rest before colliding with a nucleus.

In rare cases, the incoming K^{−} can instead produce a Ξ hypernucleus via the reaction:

p + K^{−} → Ξ^{−} + K^{+}

The equivalent strangeness production reaction involves a π^{+} meson reacts with a neutron to change it to a Λ:

n + π^{+} → Λ + K^{+}

This reaction has a maximum cross section at a beam momentum of 1.05 GeV/c, and is the most efficient production route for Λ hypernuclei, but requires larger targets than strangeness exchange methods.

=== Elastic scattering ===
Electron scattering off of a proton can change it to a Λ and produce a K^{+}:

p + e^{−} → Λ + e^{−}′ + K^{+}

where the prime symbol denotes a scattered electron. The energy of an electron beam can be more easily tuned than pion or kaon beams, making it easier to measure and calibrate hypernuclear energy levels. Initially theoretically predicted in the 1980s, this method was first used experimentally in the early 2000s.

=== Hyperon capture ===
The capture of a Ξ^{−} baryon by a nucleus can make a Ξ^{−} exotic atom or hypernucleus. Upon capture, it changes to a ΛΛ hypernucleus or two Λ hypernuclei. The disadvantage is that the Ξ^{−} baryon is harder to make into a beam than singly strange hadrons. However, an experiment at J-PARC begun in 2020 will compile data on Ξ and ΛΛ hypernuclei using a similar, non-beam setup where scattered Ξ^{−} baryons rain onto an emulsion target.

== Similar species ==
=== Kaonic nuclei ===
The K^{–} meson can orbit a nucleus in an exotic atom, such as in kaonic hydrogen. Although the K^{–}-proton strong interaction in kaonic hydrogen is repulsive, the K^{–}–nucleus interaction is attractive for larger systems, so this meson can enter a strongly bound state closely related to a hypernucleus; in particular, the K^{–}–proton–proton system is experimentally known and more tightly bound than a normal nucleus.

=== Charmed hypernuclei ===
Nuclei containing a charm quark have been predicted theoretically since 1977, and are described as charmed hypernuclei despite the possible absence of strange quarks. In particular, the lightest charmed baryons, the Λ_{c} and Σ_{c} baryons, (Note: The subscript c in the symbols for charmed baryons indicate that a strange quark in a hyperon is replaced with a charm quark; the superscript, if present, still represents the total charge of the baryon.) are predicted to exist in bound states in charmed hypernuclei, and could be created in processes analogous to those used to make hypernuclei. The depth of the Λ_{c} potential in nuclear matter is predicted to be 58 MeV, but unlike Λ hypernuclei, larger hypernuclei containing the positively charged Λ_{c} would be less stable than the corresponding Λ hypernuclei due to Coulomb repulsion. The mass difference between the Λ_{c} and the Σ^{+}_{c} is too large for appreciable mixing of these baryons to occur in hypernuclei. Weak decays of charmed hypernuclei have strong relativistic corrections compared to those in ordinary hypernuclei, as the energy released in the decay process is comparable to the mass of the Λ baryon.

=== Antihypernuclei ===
In August 2024 the STAR Collaboration reported the observation of the heaviest antimatter nucleus known, antihyperhydrogen-4 ${}_{\bar{{\boldsymbol{\Lambda }}}}{}^{{\bf{4}}}\bar{{\bf{H}}}$ consisting of one antiproton, two antineutrons and an antihyperon.

The anti-lambda hyperon $\bar{\Lambda }$ and the antihypertriton ${}_{\bar{\Lambda }}{}^{3}\bar{{\rm{H}}}$ have also been previously observed.

== See also ==
- Strangelet, a hypothetical form of matter that also contains strange quarks
