= HD 17092 =

Orange-hued star in the constellation Perseus

Observation data Epoch J2000.0 Equinox ICRS
- Constellation: Perseus
- Right ascension: 02^{h} 46^{m} 22.1179^{s}
- Declination: +49° 39′ 11.095″
- Apparent magnitude (V): 7.73

Characteristics
- Evolutionary stage: Giant
- Spectral type: K0III
- B−V color index: 1.247±0.014

Astrometry
| Radial velocity (R_{v}) | 5.49±0.03 km/s |
| Proper motion (μ) | RA: 40.328±0.100 mas/yr Dec.: −10.312±0.099 mas/yr |
| Parallax (π) | 4.3499±0.0516 mas |
| Distance | 750 ± 9 ly (230 ± 3 pc) |
| Absolute magnitude (M_{V}) | +1.76 |

Details
| Mass | 1.23±0.18 M_{☉} |
| Radius | 12.04+0.51 −0.35 R_{☉} |
| Luminosity | 57±1 L_{☉} |
| Surface gravity (log g) | 2.47±0.11 cgs |
| Temperature | 4,630±30 K |
| Metallicity [Fe/H] | 0.11±0.05 dex |
| Rotation | 505 days |
| Rotational velocity (v sin i) | <1 km/s |
| Age | 5.82±2.75 Gyr |

Other designations
- BD+49°767, HD 17092, SAO 38313, PPM 45466

Database references
| SIMBAD | data |

HD 17092 is a star in the constellation of Perseus. It has an orange hue but is visible only with binoculars or better equipment, having an apparent visual magnitude of 7.73. The distance to this star is approximately 750 light years from the Sun based on parallax, and is drifting further away with a radial velocity of +5.5 km/s.

This object is an aging giant star with a stellar classification of K0III, which means it has exhausted the supply of hydrogen at its core then cooled and expanded off the main sequence. It is roughly six billion years old with 1.2 times the mass of the Sun and has expanded to 12 times the Sun's radius. The star is radiating 57 times the luminosity of the Sun from its enlarged photosphere at an effective temperature of 4,630 K.

== Planetary system ==
On 6 May 2007, a planet HD 17092 b was discovered with the Hobby-Eberly Telescope by Niedzielski who used the radial velocity method. This planet is a massive gas giant and orbits at 1.29 astronomical units from the star with a period of about 360 days.

The HD 17092 planetary system
| Companion (in order from star) | Mass | Semimajor axis (AU) | Orbital period (days) | Eccentricity | Inclination (°) | Radius |
|---|---|---|---|---|---|---|
| b | ≥4.6±0.3 M_{J} | 1.29±0.05 | 359.9±2.4 | 0.166±0.052 | — | — |
