= Gausson (physics) =

The Gausson is a soliton which is the solution of the logarithmic Schrödinger equation, which describes a quantum particle in a possible nonlinear quantum mechanics. The logarithmic Schrödinger equation preserves the dimensional homogeneity of the equation, i.e. the product of the independent solutions in one dimension remain the solution in multiple dimensions. While the nonlinearity alone cannot cause the quantum entanglement between dimensions, the logarithmic Schrödinger equation can be solved by the separation of variables.

Let the nonlinear Logarithmic Schrödinger equation in one dimension will be given by ($\hbar = 1$, unit mass $m=1$):

$$i{\partial \psi \over \partial t} = -\frac{1}{ 2} \frac{\partial^2 \psi}{ \partial x^2}- a \ln |\psi|^2\psi$$

Let assume the Galilean invariance i.e.

$$\frac{}{}\psi(x,t)=e^{-i E t}\psi(x-k t)$$

Substituting

$$\frac{}{}y=x-k t$$

The first equation can be written as

$$-\frac{1}{ 2} \left[ {\frac{\partial}{ \partial y}+ik}\right]^2 \psi -a \ln |\psi|^2 \psi=\left( E + \frac{k^2}{2} \right) \psi$$

Substituting additionally

$$\frac{}{}\Psi(y)=e^{-iky}\psi(y)$$

and assuming

$$\Psi(y)=N e^{-\omega y^2/2}$$

we get the normal Schrödinger equation for the quantum harmonic oscillator:

$$-\frac{1}{ 2}  {\frac{\partial^2 \Psi}{ \partial y^2}} + a \omega y^2\Psi=\left( E +  \frac{k^2}{2} +N^2 a \right) \Psi$$

The solution is therefore the normal ground state of the harmonic oscillator if only $(a>0)$

$$\frac{}{} a \omega=\omega^2/2$$

or

$$\frac{}{} \omega=2 a$$

The full solitonic solution is therefore given by

$$\frac{}{}\psi(x,t) = N e^{-i E t} e^{ik{(x-kt)}}e^{-a ({x-kt})^2}$$

where

$$\frac{}{}E=a(1-N^2) - k^2/2$$

This solution describes the soliton moving with the constant velocity and not changing the shape (modulus) of the Gaussian function. When a potential is added, not only can a single Gausson provide an exact solution to a number of cases of the Logarithmic Schrödinger equation, it has been found that a linear combination of Gaussons can very accurately approximate excited states as well. This superposition property of Gaussons has been demonstrated for quadratic potentials.
