= Polish Physical Society =

- Polskie Towarzystwo Fizyczne
- Abbreviation: PTF
- Formation: 11 April 1920; 106 years ago
- Type: Learned society
- Purpose: Research
- Headquarters: Warsaw
- Location: Poland
- Members: 1,995
- Official language: Polish
- Key people: Stanisław Kistryn (President)
- Website: https://www.ptf.net.pl/

The Polish Physical Society (Polish: Polskie Towarzystwo Fizyczne, PTF) is a professional scientific society of Polish physicists.

== History ==
The Polish Physical Society was established during an organizational meeting on 11 April 1920 in Warsaw. Władysław Natanson was appointed the first president of the society. In 1932, the society's reports were reorganized into science journal Acta Physica Polonica. In 1949, the first issue of Postępy Fizyki magazine was published. Since 1951, the Polish Physical Society has been organizing physics olympiads across Poland. In 1970, the first issue of Reports on Mathematical Physics was published in Toruń.

In 2005, the first direct elections of the society's governing body were held using electronic voting. In 2006, PTF has become a public benefit organization. The society has 1977 ordinary members as well as 18 supporting members. It consists of 19 regional centres located in Bydgoszcz, Białystok, Częstochowa, Gdańsk, Gliwice, Katowice, Kielce, Kraków, Lublin, Łódź, Opole, Poznań, Rzeszów, Słupsk, Szczecin, Toruń, Wrocław, Warsaw and Zielona Góra.

In 2008, the society established a department which deals with supporting women physicists, debunking stereotypes and encouraging girls to take up STEM subjects with particular emphasis on physics.

== Awards of the Polish Physical Society ==
PTS awards the following prizes:

- Marian Smoluchowski Medal
- Smoluchowski-Warburg Prize
- Wojciech Rubinowicz Prize
- Arkadiusz Piekara Prize for best MSc thesis
- Krzysztof Ernst Prize for popularizing physics
- PTF Award for best physics teachers
- PTF Special Award

== Presidents of the Polish Physical Society ==
- Stanisław Kistryn (2026–present)
- Teresa Rząca–Urban (2022–2025)
- Leszek Sirko (2018–2022)
- Katarzyna Chałasińska–Macukow (2014–2017)
- Wiesław Kamiński (2010–2013)
- Reinhard Kulessa (2006–2009)
- Maciej Kolwas (2002–2005)
- Ireneusz Strzałkowski (1997–2001)
- Henryk Szymczak (1993–1997)
- Stefan Pokorski (1991–1993)
- Janusz Zakrzewski (1987–1991)
- Tadeusz Skaliński (1981–1987)
- Zdzisław Wilhelmi (1974–1981)
- Wojciech Rubinowicz (1961–1974)
- Aleksander Jabłoński (1957–1961)
- Leopold Infeld (1955–1957)
- Andrzej Sołtan (1952–1955)
- Wojciech Rubinowicz (1949–1952)
- Stefan Pieńkowski (1947–1949)
- Stefan Pieńkowski (1938)
- Czesław Białobrzeski (1934–1938)
- Mieczysław Wolfke (1930–1934)
- Stefan Pieńkowski (1923–1930)
- Władysław Natanson (1920–1923)

== Honorary members of the Polish Physical Society ==
- Marie Curie
- Władysław Natanson
- Frédéric Joliot-Curie
- Stefan Pieńkowski
- Wojciech Rubinowicz
- Alfred Kastler
- Aleksander Jabłoński
- Stanisław Mrozowski
- Zdzisław Wilhelmi
- Marian Mięsowicz
- Andrzej Kajetan Wróblewski
- Henryk Szymczak
- Franciszek Kaczmarek

== See also ==
- European Physical Society
- Polish Chemical Society
- Polish Mathematical Society
