= Marian Danysz =

Polish physicist (1909–1983)

Marian Danysz (March 17, 1909 – February 9, 1983) was a Polish physicist, Professor of Physics at University of Warsaw. He is known for co-discovering with Jerzy Pniewski a hypernucleus in 1952, which alongside a proton and neutron contains a third particle, today recognized as possessing a lambda hyperon (Λ^{0}).

Ten years later, they obtained a hypernucleus in an excited state, and the following year a hypernucleus with two lambda baryons.

He was the son of physicist Jan Kazimierz Danysz.
