= Andrzej Kajetan Wróblewski =

Polish experimental physicist

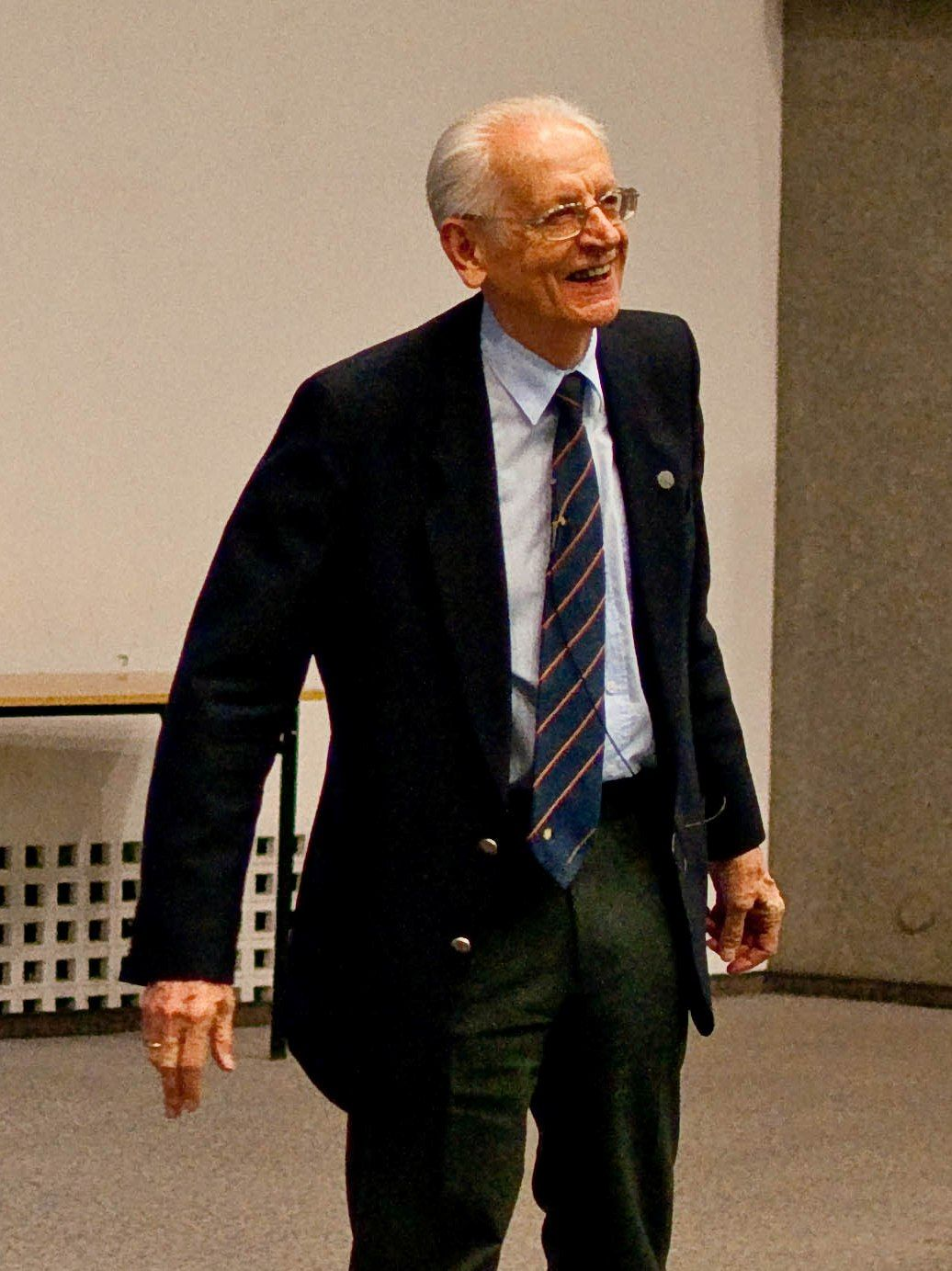
- Andrzej Kajetan Wróblewski during a lecture in 2011
- Born: 8 July 1933 (age 93); Warsaw, Second Polish Republic
- Education: University of Warsaw
- Occupation: physicist
- Known for: research on particle physics
- Awards: Commander's Cross with Star of the Order of Polonia Restituta (1998)

Andrzej Kajetan Wróblewski (Polish pronunciation: Vrooblevski, born 7 August 1933 in Warsaw) – Polish experimental physicist, ordinary professor doctor habilitatus (since 1971), dean of the Physics Department Warsaw University (1986–1989), Rector of the Warsaw University (1989–1993), President of the Academic Council of the Institute for the History of Science, Polish Academy of Sciences.

Member of the PAS (since 1976), Warsaw Scientific Society (since 1983), Polish Physical Society and Polish Astronomical Society.

== Scholarly activity ==
Andrzej Kajetan Wróblewski works at the Institute of Experimental Physics of the Physics Department, Warsaw University. He specializes in elementary particle physics (high energy physics) i.e. Soft Hadron Physics (1990), New AMY and DELPHI multiplicity data and the log-normal distribution (with co-authors; 1990), Genesis of the lognormal multiplicity distribution in the e² e²- collisions and other stochastic processes (with co-authors; 1990), Mystery of the negative binomial distribution (with co-authors; 1987), Constraints on multiplicity distribution of quark pairs (1985). His books on the history of physics are mainly in Polish: Truth and Myths in Physics' (1982); History of Physics' (2007). He is also co-author (with J. A. Zakrzewski) of the Introduction to Physics' (vol. 1 1976, vol. 2, part 1-2 1989–1991).

== Awards ==
- Marie Curie Award (1973)
- Honorary degree of the University in Siegen (1980)
- Honorary degree of the Chapman University (1990)
- Honorary degree of the University of Glasgow (1992)
- National Order of Merit, France (1994)
- Commander's Cross with Star of the Order of Polonia Restituta (1998)
- Marian Smoluchowski Medal (1999)
- Honorary degree of the Warsaw University of Technology (2011)
- Honorary degree of the Jan Kochanowski University in Kielce (2017)
