= Angelo Rossi =

Angelo Rossi may refer to:

- Angelo Joseph Rossi (1878–1948), mayor of San Francisco
- Angelo Maria Rossi, First Catholic bishop of the Diocese of Ponta de Pedras, Brazil
- Angelo Rossi (bishop) (died 1568), Italian Roman Catholic bishop
- Angelo de Rossi (1671–1715), Italian sculptor
- Angelo Rossi (partisan) (1915–1987), Italian communist militant and partisan
- Angelo Rossi (Italian politician) (born 1976), Italian politician

== See also ==
- Agnelo Rossi
- Angelo Ross
