= Adam Vetulani =

Polish legal historian (1901–1976)

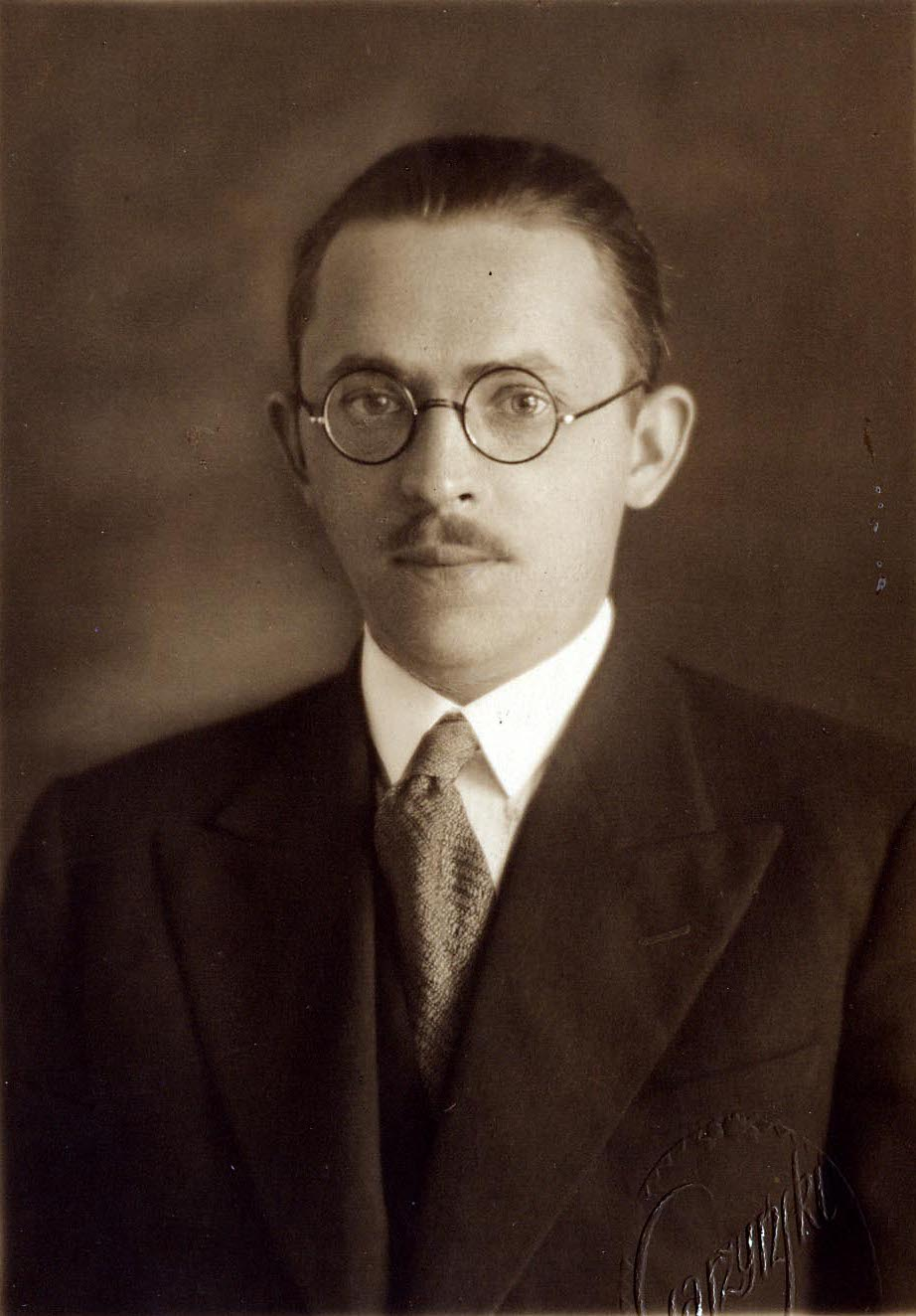
- Born: Adam Joachim Vetulani; 20 March 1901; Sanok
- Died: 25 September 1976 (aged 75); Busko-Zdroj
- Citizenship: Polish
- Education: Jagiellonian University (master's degree, law)
- Occupation: legal historian
- Known for: professor at Jagiellonian University, General Secretary of the Polish Academy of Learning (1957–58)
- Children: Kristine Vetulani-Belfoure (1924–2004), Jerzy Vetulani (1936–2017), Jan Vetulani (1938–1965)
- Parents: Roman Vetulani (father); Elżbieta née Kunachowicz (mother)
- Awards: Croix de Guerre, Polish Cross of Valor

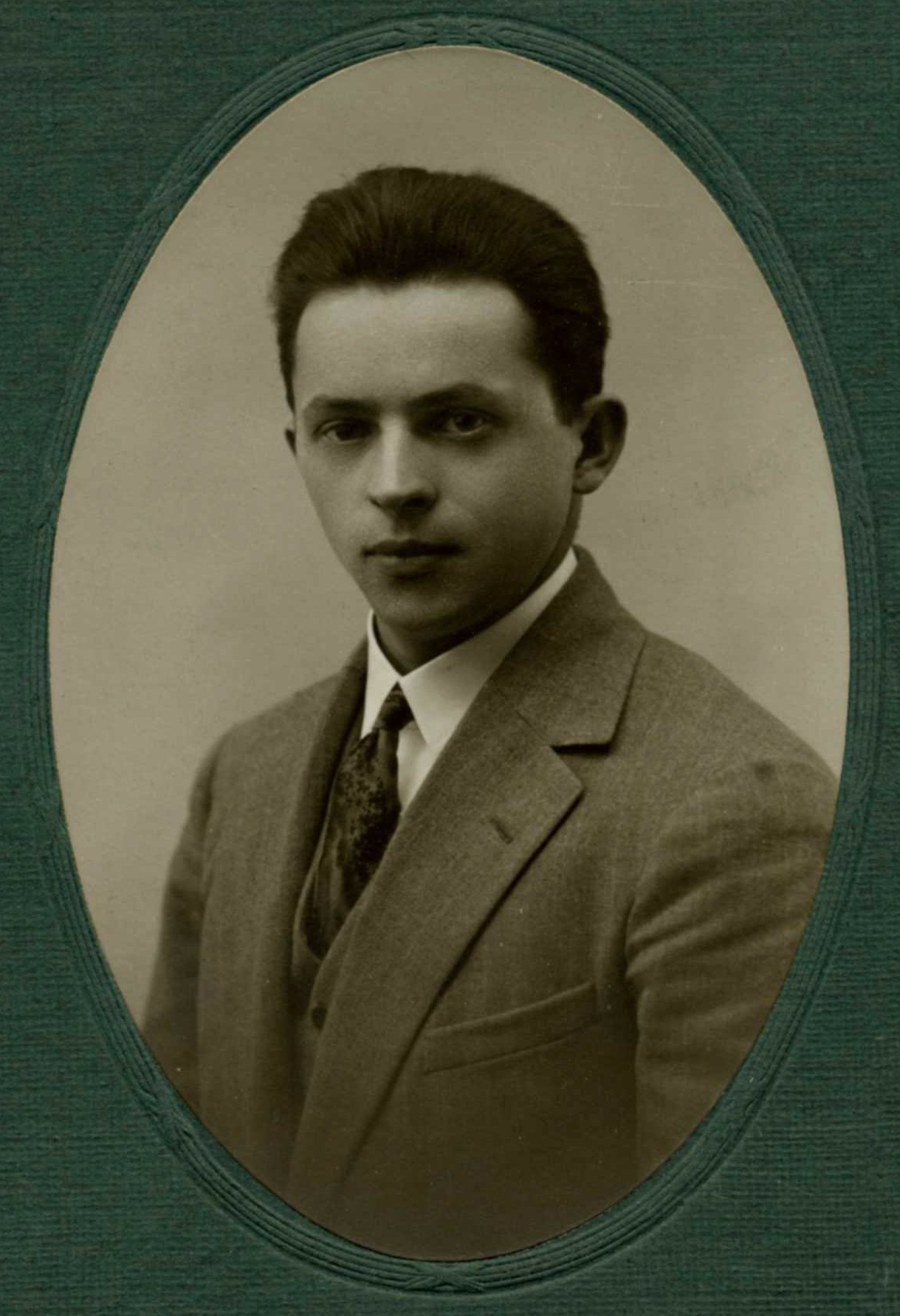
Adam Vetulani

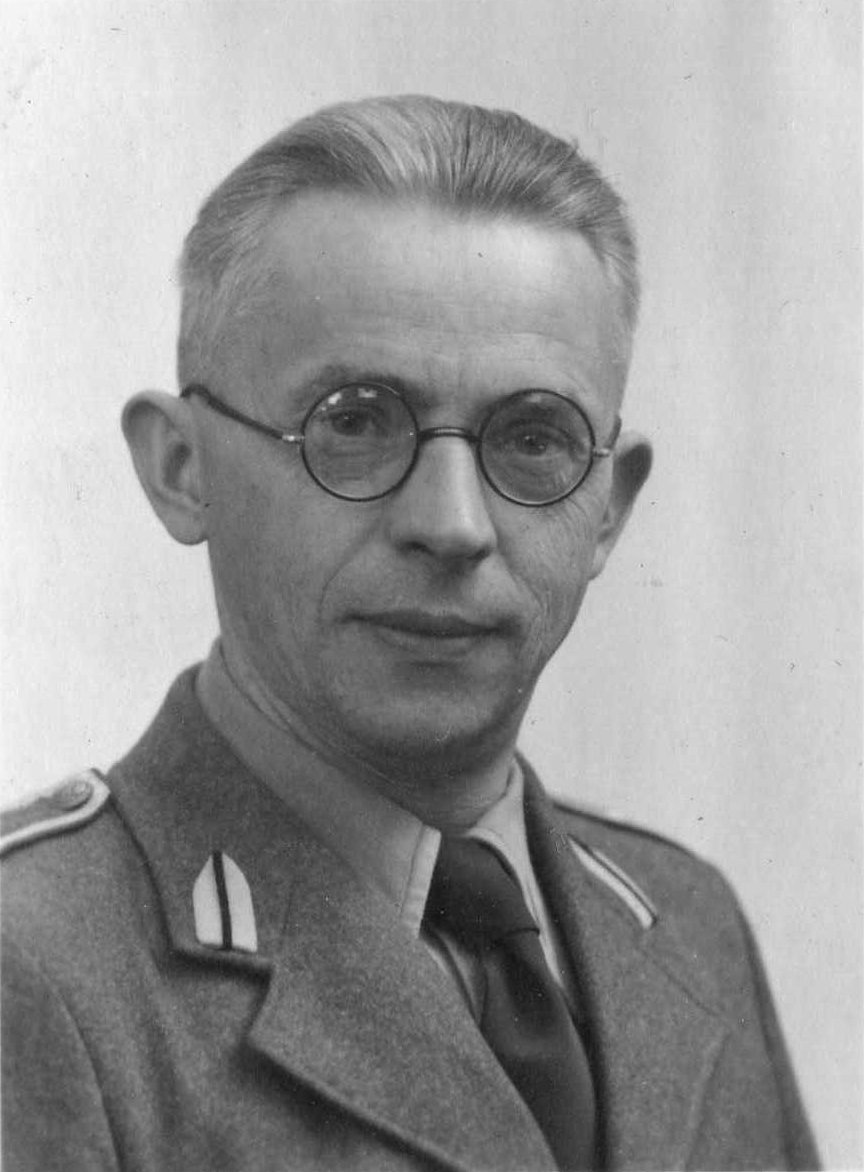
Adam Vetulani

Adam Joachim Vetulani (20 March 1901 – 25 September 1976) was a Polish historian of medieval and canon law, professor of the Jagiellonian University.

== Biography ==
He was the son of high school professor, Roman Vetulani, and Elżbieta née Kunachowicz, brother of Kazimierz, Tadeusz, Zygmunt, Maria, and Elżbieta. He attended high schools in Sanok and Cieszyn, in 1917 he passed examination of maturity in Vienna.

In 1919 he began studying law at the Jagiellonian University. After taking part in Polish–Soviet War in 1920 (for which he was decorated with Cross of Valor) Adam Vetulani returned to the university and received master's degree in 1923. Stanisław Kutrzeba had a strong influence on Vetulani, who received his doctorate with Kutrzeba supervision, in 1925.

In 1927 he married Irena Latinik, they had two sons: Jerzy (1936–2017) and Jan (1938–1965). Adam Vetulani had also daughter Krystyna (1924–2004).

After the outbreak of World War II, when Nazis invaded Poland, Adam Vetulani was enrolled in the Polish Army. In September 1939 he left with his unit to Romania. Then in 1940 he took part in fights in France and was internee in Switzerland, where he spent the rest of the war organising education for other internees.

In scientific work Adam Vetulani did research on Decretum Gratiani. He published more than three hundreds works in various languages. He was an acquaintance of Karol Wojtyła, with whom he collaborated.

He was a General Secretary of the Polish Academy of Learning (1957–1958). His doctoral students included Juliusz Bardach, Stanisław Roman, Stanisław Grodziski, Wojciech Bartel, Ludwik Łysiak, Stanisław Płaza and Wacław Uruszczak. He was under surveillance by the Security Service.

His remainings were buried at the Rakowicki Cemetery.

In 2014, Adam Vetulani's correspondence with Miroslav Boháček was published. In 2023, a biography Adam Vetulani (1901–1976). Historian of Polish and Canon Law by Piotr Biliński was published by Jagiellonian University Press.

== Published works ==
- Nagana sądowa w dawnem prawie polskiem. 1923.
- Z dziejów strasburskiej kapituły katedralnej. 1927.
- Lenno pruskie. Od traktatu krakowskiego do śmierci księcia Albrechta 1525–1568. Studium historyczno-prawne. 1930.
- Włoska ustawa o ślubach kościelnych, 1930.
- Początki oficjalatu biskupiego w Polsce, 1934.
- O sposobie powoływania się na przepisy prawa rzymskiego i kanonicznego w późniejszym średniowieczu, 1936.
- Przeciw elitaryzmowi, 1936.
- Polskie wpływy polityczne w Prusach Książęcych. 1939.
- Historia ustroju Polski w zarysie. 1941.
- Dekret Gracjana w świetle najnowszych badań, 1948.
- Dzieje historii prawa w Polsce. 1948.
- Wrocławskie rękopisy statutów Mikołaja Trąby, 1948.
- Polska i Prusy Książęce w związku ustrojowym. Próba popularnej syntezy, 1949.
- Z badań nad znajomością powszechnego prawa kanonicznego w Polsce w XIII wieku, 1949.
- O nowe ujęcie historii źródeł dawnego prawa polskiego, 1952.
- Władztwo Polski w Prusiech Zakonnych i Książęcych 1454–1657. Wybór źródeł, 1953
- Prawny stosunek Prus Książęcych do Polski 1466–1657, 1954.
- W sprawie prawa chłopskiego w Polsce feudalnej, 1956.
- Kanonista Stephanus Polonus, 1960.
- Nowe wydanie niemieckiego zwodu prawa polskiego, 1960.
- Początki najstarszych wszechnic środkowoeuropejskich. 1970.
- Poza płomieniami wojny. Internowani w Szwajcarii 1940–45. 1976. Memoirs.
- Z badań nad kulturą prawniczą w Polsce piastowskiej. 1976.
- Sur Gratien et les Décrétales. 1990. Posthumously.

== Awards and distinctions ==
He was decorated with Croix de Guerre avec étoile (for World War II), twice with Polish Cross of Valor (for Polish–Soviet War and World War II), and with 1939–1945 Commemorative war medal and Croix du combattant. He was an honorary doctor of University of Strasbourg, University of Nancy and University of Pécs. He was awarded with Medal of the Commission of National Education.

== Family tree ==
Vetulani family

* the list is incomplete

Michał Vetulani	Franciszka (née Śliwińska)
Jan	Matylda (née Pisz)	Roman	Elżbieta (née Kunachowicz)	Franciszek; Latinik	Franciszek	Katarzyna (née Ipohorska)
Eugeniusz	Kazimierz	Zygmunt	Tadeusz	Maria (née Godlewska)	Adam	Irena (née Latinik)	Zofia	Bohdan de Nisau	Maria	Cecylia
Armand	Wanda	Zygmunt	Grażyna (née Świerczyńska)	Krystyna	Jerzy	Maria (née Pająk)	Witold
Agnieszka	Maria	Charles	Tomasz

== Bibliography ==
- Uruszczak, Wacław (2000). "Adam Joachim Vetulani". In Jerzy Stelmach, Wacław Uruszczak (ed.). Uniwersytet Jagielloński. Złota Księga Wydziału Prawa i Administracji. Kraków: Wydawnictwo Uniwersytetu Jagiellońskiego. pp. 393–400. Archived from the original on 9 May 2024.
- Żukowski, Przemysław (2014). "Vetulani Adam Joachim". In Dorota Malec (ed.). Profesorowie Wydziału Prawa Uniwersytetu Jagiellońskiego. Vol. 2. Kraków: Wydawnictwo Uniwersytetu Jagiellońskiego. pp. 552–554. ISBN 978-83-233-3663-1. Archived from the original on 11 June 2026.
- Biliński, Piotr (2022). "Adam Vetulani (1901–1976)". In Jerzy Strzelczyk (ed.). Mediewiści (PDF). Vol. 10. pp. 195–209. Archived from the original (PDF) on 21 May 2026.
