= Zygmunt Vetulani (computer scientist) =

Polish mathematician and computer scientist (born 1950)

Zygmunt Władysław Vetulani
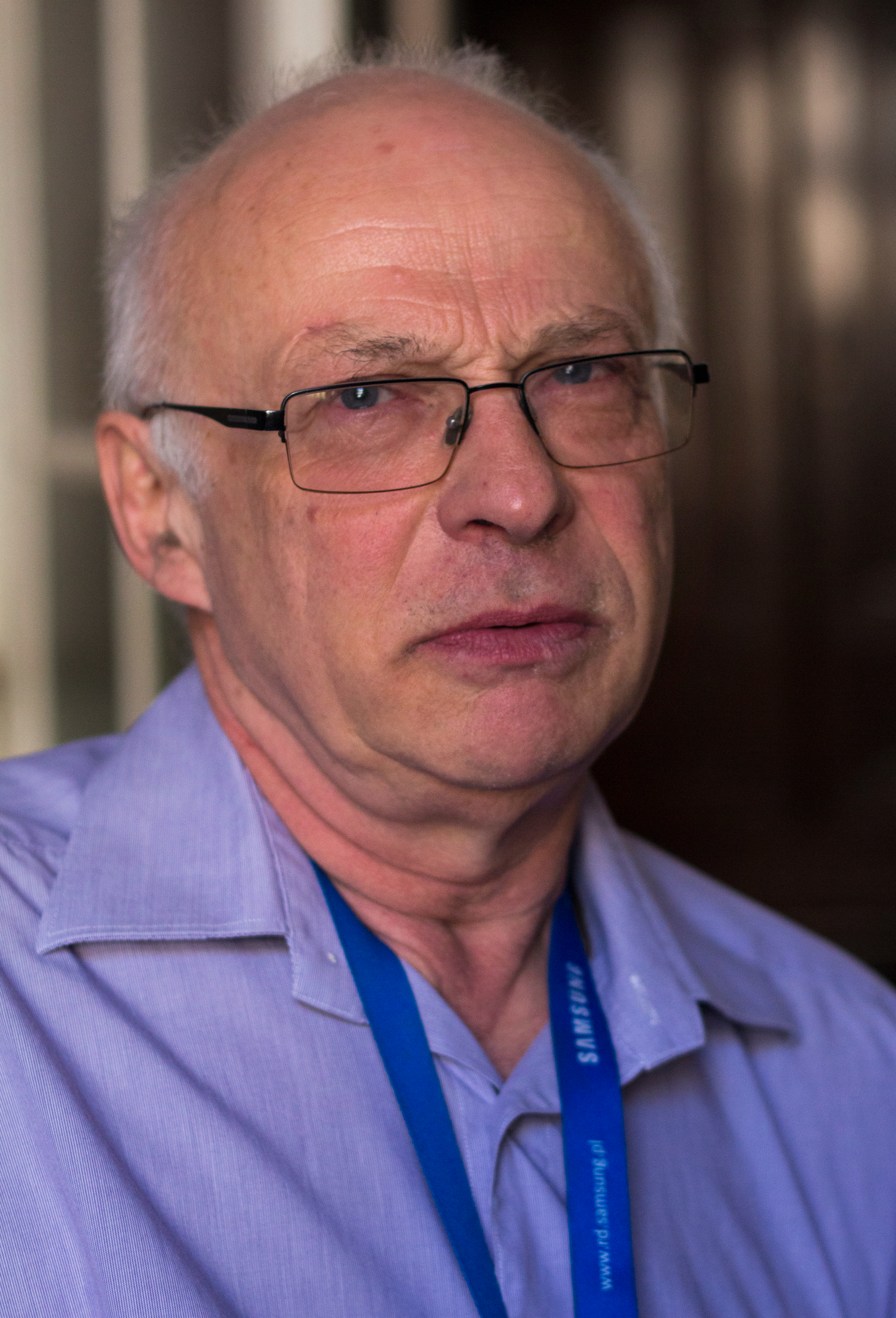
- Zygmunt Vetulani, 2018
- Born: 12 September 1950 (age 75); Poznań
- Citizenship: Polish
- Education: Adam Mickiewicz University in Poznań
- Occupations: Computer scientist Mathematician
- Spouse: Grażyna Małgorzata Vetulani
- Children: Agnieszka, Maria

Zygmunt Władysław Vetulani (born 12 September 1950) is a Polish mathematician and computer scientist who specializes in language engineering and artificial intelligence, professor of technical sciences and professor at the Adam Mickiewicz University where he is also Head of the Department of Information Linguistics and Artificial Intelligence.

== Biography ==
=== Professional career ===
He was born in 1950 in Poznań and was the only son of Polish zoologist Tadeusz Vetulani and medical doctor and stomatologist Maria née Godlewska. He attended the prestigious Karol Marcinkowski High School, where he passed matura in 1968. In 1973 he graduated in mathematics from Adam Mickiewicz University in Poznań. He received his PhD in 1977 at the University of Warsaw. In 1982 he obtained his second master's degree graduating in Roman philology from Adam Mickiewicz University. He was a scholarship holder of the French Government at the Université d'Aix-Marseille II (1984) and the Alexander von Humboldt Foundation at the Bielefeld University and the University of Paris VII (1987–1989).

In 1990 he received a habilitation degree at the Faculty of Modern Languages at the Adam Mickiewicz University in the field of humanities (computer linguistics). Since 1993, he has been Head of the Department of Information Linguistics and Artificial Intelligence at the Faculty of Mathematics and Computer Science at the Adam Mickiewicz University. On 30 May 2006 he received the title of professor of technical sciences in the field of computer science.

Vetulani has published more than 100 research papers and six books which cover subjects such as computational linguistics, language engineering, artificial intelligence and mathematical logic. He created linguistic resources of databases for Polish language (POLEX, PolNex) and IT systems with language competence (POLINT, POLiNT-112-SMS). He is an organizer and chair of the program committee of the Language and Technology Conference (LTC) held every two years in Poznań since 2005.

In 1990 he was awarded the Minister of National Education Award, and in 2001 he was awarded the Adam Mickiewicz University Rector Prize.

=== Hobby activities and personal life ===
In his free time he is an amateur fencer and a sports activist. He is a member of the training staff and deputy head of the fencing section of KS Warta Poznań club. He co-organized numerous fencing events, among others European Fencing Festival. In 2009 he was the initiator and the creator of the fencing section of KU AZS UAM (University Club of the Academic Sports Association of the Adam Mickiewicz University). In 2014 and 2015, as a representative of Poland, he performed at the European Veterans Championship in fencing. Also in 2015 he won a bronze medal at the European Fencing Veterans' Games held in Nice.

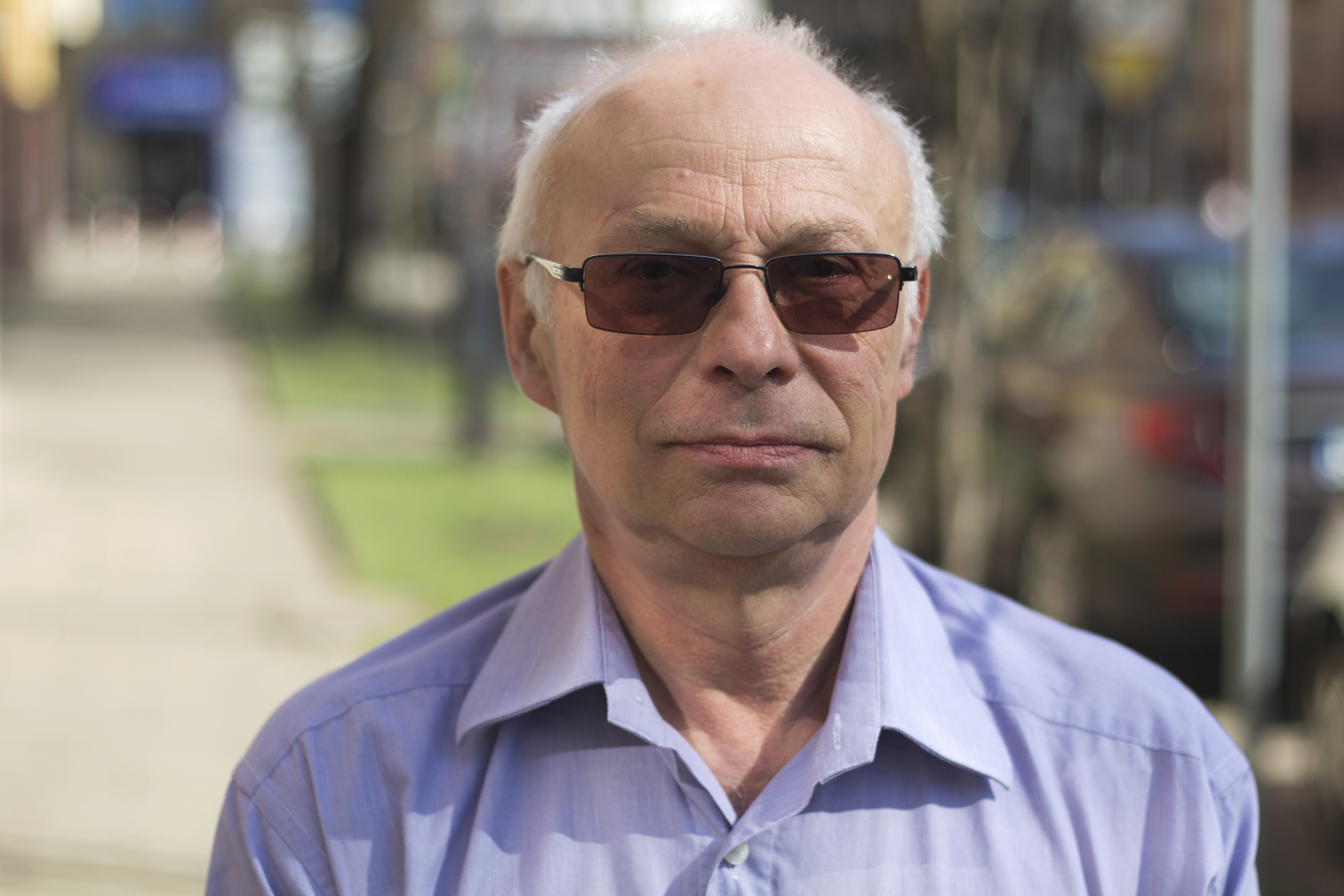
Zygmunt Vetulani, 2018

He is interested in the history of his family. He arranged and donated to the Archive of the Polish Academy of Sciences in Poznań a large part of his father's legacy. He published a chapter about the Vetulani family in the book Sanok – nasza tożsamość (Sanok – our identity).

He is married to Grażyna Vetulani, Roman philologist and professor at the Adam Mickiewicz University. They have two daughters: Agnieszka (born 1981), a political and jurisprudence scientist, and Maria (born 1996), a fencer.

== Books ==
- 1990: Corpus of consultative dialogues: experimentally collected source data for AI applications (Wydawnictwo Naukowe UAM);
- 1996: Język i technologia (with Grażyna Vetulani and Witold Abramowicz; Akademicka Oficyna Wydawnicza PLJ – in Polish);
- 2004: Komunikacja człowieka z maszyną: komputerowe modelowanie kompetencji językowej (Akademicka Oficyna Wydawnicza EXIT – in Polish).

=== Edited by ===
- Human Language Technologies as a Challenge for Computer Science and Linguistics – 2025 (PDF). Poznań: Wydawnictwo Naukowe Uniwersytetu im. Adama Mickiewicza w Poznaniu. 2025. ISBN 978-83-232-4541-4. Archived from the original (PDF) on 12 August 2026. Co-edited with Patrick Paroubek and Irakli Kardava.

== Family tree ==
Vetulani family

* the list is incomplete

Michał Vetulani	Franciszka (née Śliwińska)
Jan	Matylda (née Pisz)	Roman	Elżbieta (née Kunachowicz)	Franciszek; Latinik	Franciszek	Katarzyna (née Ipohorska)
Eugeniusz	Kazimierz	Zygmunt	Tadeusz	Maria (née Godlewska)	Adam	Irena (née Latinik)	Zofia	Bohdan de Nisau	Maria	Cecylia
Armand	Wanda	Zygmunt	Grażyna (née Świerczyńska)	Krystyna	Jerzy	Maria (née Pająk)	Witold
Agnieszka	Maria	Charles	Tomasz
