= Lawyers in Poland =

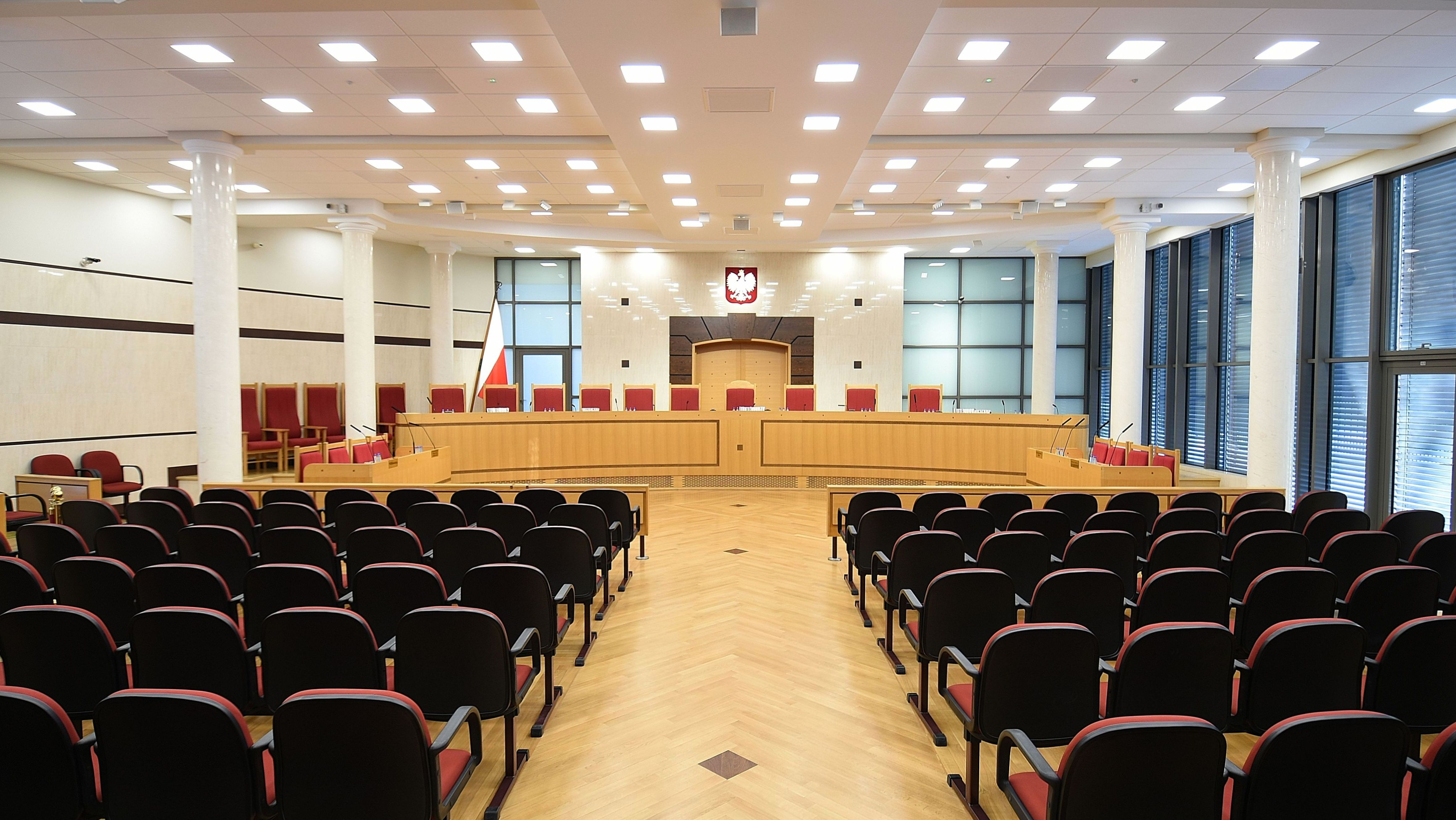
Main courtroom at Polish Constitutional Tribunal (2016)

In Poland, any person holding a Magister's degree in law (Polish: magister prawa) is called a jurist (Polish: prawnik).

== Lawyers ==
Polish lawyers may work in licensed legal professions, public administration, law enforcement, tax services and governmental agencies. Since a legal entity can be represented in a court of law by its employees, companies do not employ advocates or attorneys-at-law but instead rely on in-house lawyers, counsellors or associates not admitted to the bar.

Because an agent can act for any person under Polish law, some lawyers do what in the UK is done by solicitors. Thus, specialized persons write legal agreements, conduct negotiations, or execute debts. Polish law expressly permits persons with Magister's degree in law to provide legal counselling.

In the reasons for judgment of the Constitutional Tribunal of 26 November 2003 (ref. no. SK 22/02), the view was expressed for the first time that the provisions in force in Poland allow persons holding a Magister's degree in law to carry out legal counselling on their own account. A consequence of the judgment was the legal sanctioning of legal counselling offices run by persons who graduated from law schools but do not belong to bar associations. The person with qualifying legal education can work as:

- counsellor at law, legal counsellor or legal advisor (Polish: doradca prawny) who provides legal advice, drafts documents and legal opinions; with a permanent contract of commission with a client, a counsellor has power of attorney in administrative proceedings and selected civil proceedings.

== Licensed legal professions ==
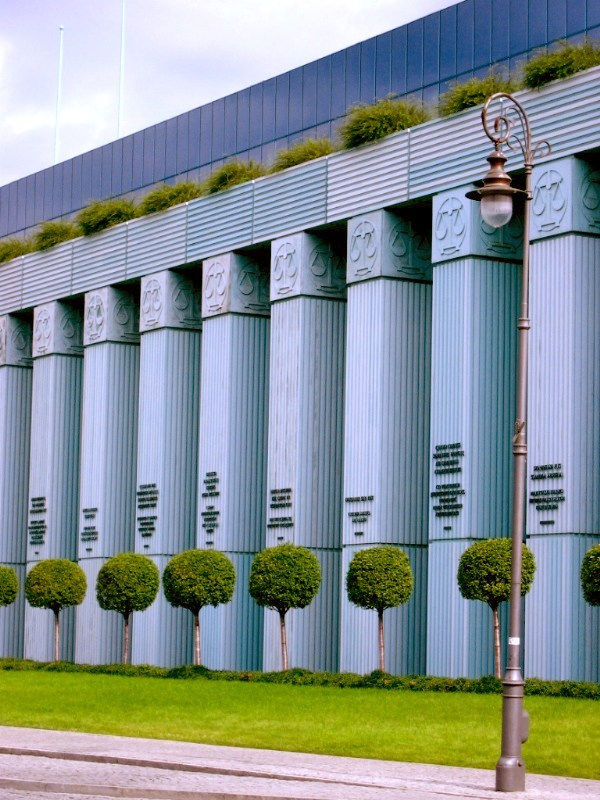
Columns of the Supreme Court of Poland building (2007)

The licensed legal professions are as follows:

- judge (Polish: sędzia);
- prosecutor (Polish: prokurator), a legal representative of the State, except for trials involving the Treasury, their primary duties include prosecution, supervision over police investigations and acting on behalf of public interest in all trials;
- counsel of the State Attorney Office (Polish: radca Prokuratorii Generalnej Skarbu Państwa), a legal representative of the Treasury where significant State property is at stake, their representation is also mandatory in all trials involving the Treasury at central courts,
- legislative counsel (Polish: legislator), a legal profession whose practice consists in providing professional assistance to public authorities in the law-making process,
- advocate (Polish: adwokat), whose primary function is to provide legal assistance, prepare legal opinions and drafts of legislative acts, and represent persons before a court in civil, administrative and criminal trials;
- attorney at law (Polish: radca prawny), whose primary function is to provide legal assistance, prepare legal opinions and drafts of legislative acts, and represent persons before a court in civil, administrative and criminal trials;
- notary (Polish: notariusz), whose job consists of a blend of civil law notary and notary public duties;
- bailiff (Polish: komornik), a public officer (but not an official) whose primary function is to execute court's decisions concerning civil claims.

Some legal professions may also be performed by graduates in other specific disciplines, such as economics or engineering. They require an appropriate admission examination to be passed; as such, lawyers are authorised to represent persons before courts in matters related to their profession. Such professions include:

- tax advisor (Polish: doradca podatkowy), whose primary function is to advise persons in tax matters, represent them before courts and State authorities in tax matters and perform other activities related to tax law;
- patent attorney (Polish: rzecznik patentowy), whose job consists of providing legal assistance in industrial property matters.

== Standard of courtesy – Mecenas ==
In modern Polish language, mecenas is an honorific title addressed to a person working in a legal profession and authorised to appear in a court of law on behalf of a client – advocates and attorneys at law.

== The distinction between advocates and attorneys at law ==
The division between adwokat and radca prawny was created by a 1959 law that forbade advocates from advising socialised economy units (primarily state enterprises and cooperatives, which were the dominant form of economic activity in the People's Republic of Poland) and introduced the new profession of radca prawny for that purpose.

Advocates and attorneys at law have their independent bar associations (both are members of the Council of Bars and Law Societies of Europe); membership is obligatory for those willing to practice the respective profession:

- Advocates: The National Bar Council of Advocates (ca 7,600 members);
- Attorneys-at-law: The National Bar Council of Attorneys-at-Law (ca 50,000 members).

Currently, admission to the National Bar Council of Advocates is open to the National Bar Council of Attorneys-at-Law members and vice versa. Lawyers can be members of both bar associations simultaneously; however, they cannot practice both professions concurrently.

Since 2015, the position and rights of advocates and attorneys at law are identical in almost all matters, leading to public discussion on the unification of the two professions. Legal regulations regarding the two professions slightly differ:

- Attorneys at law can enter into any employment contract while practising their profession; however, if they defend persons charged in criminal trials, they cannot remain employed under an employment contract;
- Advocates cannot enter into any employment contract while practising their profession (this includes being hired as an in-house lawyer or as an associate attorney or salaried partner at a law firm, although it is commonly evaded through self-employment);

The two bar associations have their own rules and ethical codes according to which:

- Attorneys at law are allowed to publish information about their services (advertisement is forbidden); advocates' rules in this matter are much stricter;
- Advocates are subject to significant limitations applying to the kind of business activities that they are allowed to undertake; the following actions are forbidden by the Advocates' Code of Ethics as colliding with the advocate's profession, while they are fully allowed to be performed by attorneys at law:

- holding the manager's position in another person's business entity;
- holding the position of a member of the management board or proxy in commercial partnerships and companies, except for law firms;
- acting as a regular commercial agent;
- running the same office with a person rendering other services, if they collide with advocates' ethical rule

While the Polish term radca prawny was usually literally translated to a legal advisor, in 2018, the bar adopted attorney at law as the official translation to avoid a misconception that its members only provide legal consultation and advice, rather than the full range of legal services, including representing their clients in courts.

== Admission to practice law ==
There are no bar associations for judges and public prosecutors. The Ministry of Justice is in charge of the administration of the professions, while the President of the Republic of Poland appoints judges. Advocates, attorneys at law, notaries, bailiffs, patent attorneys, and tax advisors have their bar associations.

There are several ways of admission to the bar. As to advocates and attorneys at law, the following options are available:

- Magister's degree in law followed by apprenticeship (Polish: aplikacja) and bar exam;
- Magister's degree in law followed by five years of legal professional experience and bar exam;
- Doctorate in law followed by either bar exam or three years of legal professional experience;
- High academic qualification in legal sciences (Habilitation, professorship).

=== Apprenticeship (aplikacja) ===
An examination for admission to bar apprenticeship for advocates and attorneys at law is a written test. A hundred out of a hundred and fifty points guarantee admission. The examination covers: 1) criminal law and criminal procedure; 2) infraction law and infraction court proceedings; 3) financial criminal law and financial criminal proceedings; 4) civil law and civil procedure; 5) family law; 6) public economic law; 7) commercial companies and partnerships law; 8) labour law and social security regulations; 9) administrative law and administrative procedure; 10) administrative court proceedings; 11) European Union law; 12) constitutional law; 13) organization of justice in Poland.

Bar training for advocates and attorneys at law lasts for three years and consists of theoretical and practical courses. Each trainee (Polish: aplikant) has a patron, who must be a practitioner from the respective bar. The bar examination is a written exam that lasts four days and consists of preparing various documents and briefs in the following areas: criminal law, civil or family law, commercial law, administrative law, ethics.

Bar training for notaries is longer (four years) and covers different areas of law.

=== National School of Judiciary and Public Prosecution ===
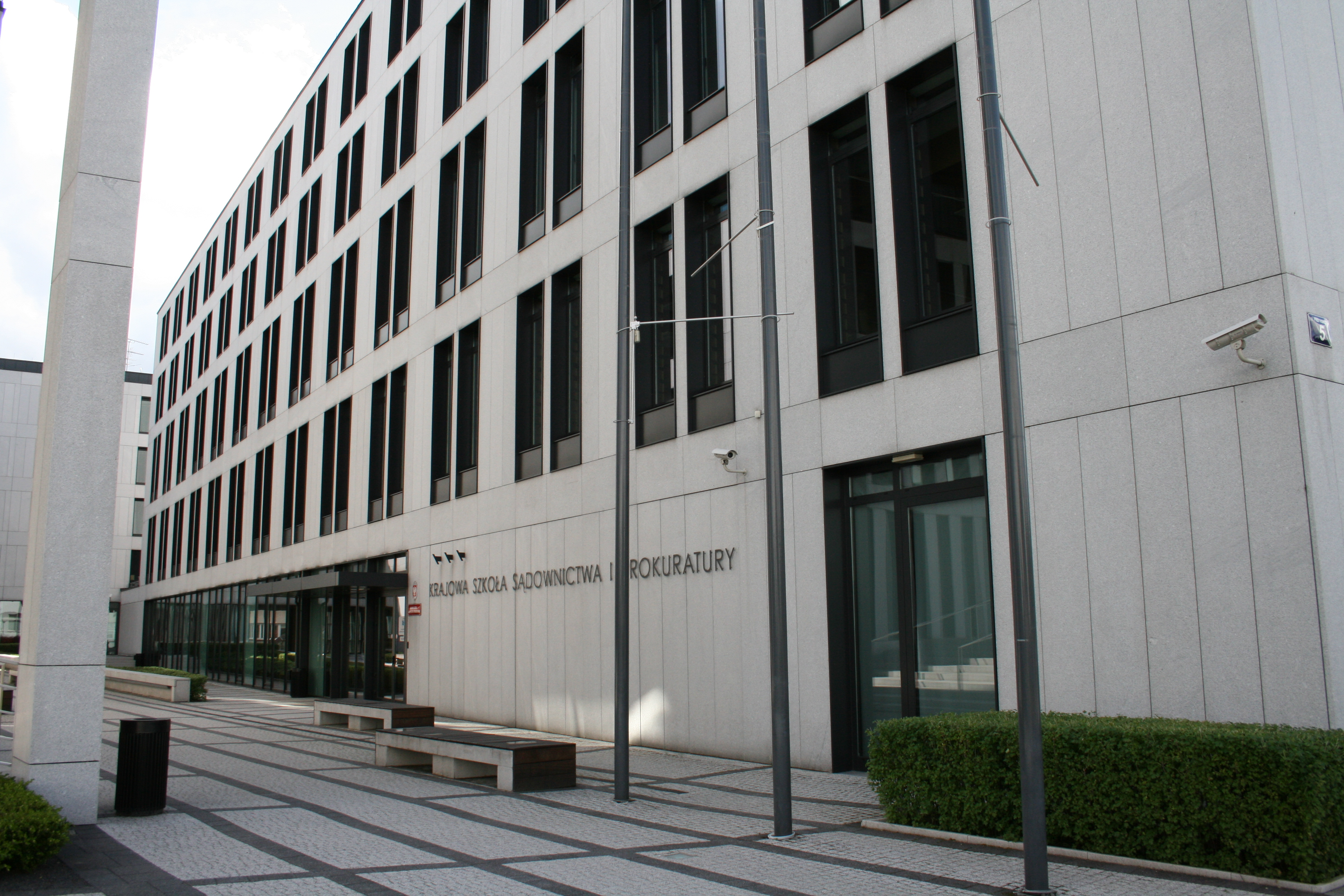
The National School of Judiciary and Public Prosecution was established in 2009 in Kraków.

The body in charge of training for future judges and public prosecutors is the National School of Judiciary and Public Prosecution in Kraków. After one year of general training, the candidates proceed to specialised training for another thirty months. Then, trainee judges serve apprenticeships as law clerks (twelve months) and as referendaries (Polish: referendarz). A similar apprenticeship is required for future public prosecutors.

== See also ==
- List of Polish lawyers
- European lawyer
- Admission to practice law
- List of law faculties in Poland
