= Angelo Rossi (partisan) =

- Born: 30 September 1915; Grosseto, Kingdom of Italy
- Died: 22 March 1987 (aged 71); Grosseto, Italy
- Other name: Trueba
- Occupations: Baker, political activist
- Political party: Italian Communist Party

Angelo Rossi (30 September 1915 – 22 March 1987), known as "Trueba", was an Italian communist militant, anti-fascist volunteer in the Spanish Civil War, and partisan active in the Italian Resistance.

== Life and career ==
Born in Grosseto in 1915 to Cesare Rossi and Giuseppa Censini, he was orphaned at an early age and adopted by Giovanni Lepri. In 1934, at the age of eighteen, he joined the Italian Communist Party, influenced by Aristeo Banchi.

In 1937 he attempted to reach Spain to join the International Brigades in support of the Spanish Republic. After being arrested in Corsica and later transferred to France, he eventually reached Spain via Paris and crossed the Pyrenees on foot. In September 1937 he enlisted in the Garibaldi Battalion of the International Brigades and fought in Extremadura, Aragon, and the Spanish Levant. Seriously wounded in 1938, he was evacuated and, following the fall of Barcelona in 1939, interned in French camps at Saint-Cyprien and Gurs.

In 1941 he was repatriated to Italy and sentenced to five years of internal exile on the island of Ventotene as an anti-Franco combatant. After being transferred for medical treatment, he was released in August 1943. Returning to Grosseto, he joined the provincial committee of the National Liberation Committee and took part in the Italian Resistance in the province.

After World War II, Rossi served as provincial secretary of the communist youth federation and organized peasant struggles through Federterra. He was active in labor protests against Montecatini and was repeatedly arrested. He later served as vice-president of the provincial League of Cooperatives and as a councillor and health assessor in the Province of Grosseto. He remained active in the provincial committee of the National Association of Italian Partisans until his death in Grosseto in 1987.

== Sources ==
- Enciclopedia dell'antifascismo e della Resistenza. Vol. 5. La Pietra. 1968.
- Banchi, Aristeo (1993). Si va pel mondo. Il partito comunista a Grosseto dalle origini al 1944. Grosseto: Arci.
- Calandrone, Giacomo (1974). La Spagna brucia. Rome: Editori Riuniti.
- Capitini Maccabruni, Nicla (1985). La Maremma contro il nazifascismo. Grosseto: La Commerciale.
- Nesti, Arnaldo (1976). Anonimi compagni: le classi subalterne sotto il fascismo. Coines.
- Niccolai, Lucio (2008). L'odore della terra. Biografie di uomini e donne che hanno fatto la Maremma dalla montagna al mare. Arcidosso: Effigi.
