= Kutrzeba =

Kutrzeba can refer to:

- Tadeusz Kutrzeba, (1885 - 1947), Polish general
- Stanisław Kutrzeba, (1876 - 1946), Polish historian
