= Piotr Biliński =

Historian (born 1974)

- Born: 1974 (age 51–52)
- Occupation: Historian

Piotr Biliński (born 1974) is a historian.

== Biography ==
In 1998 he graduated with a master's degree in history from Wyższa Szkoła Pedagogiczna (WSP) in Kraków. In 2001 he obtained doctorate. In 2008 he obtained habilitation. He was employed at the Archive of the Jagiellonian University. He has written biographies of Władysław Konopczyński, Stanisław Kutrzeba and Adam Vetulani, among others.

== Books ==
Source.

- Władysław Konopczyński. Historyk i polityk II Rzeczypospolitej (1880–1952). Warszawa: „Ad Astra”. 1999.
- Żywoty biskupów krakowskich. Kraków: „Unum”. 2000.
- Feliks Koneczny (1862–1949). Życie i działalność. Warszawa: „Ad Astra”. 2001.
- Moszyńscy: studium z dziejów łoniowskiej linii rodu w XIX wieku. Kraków: Uniwersytet Jagielloński. Biblioteka Jagiellońska. 2006.
- Stanisław Kutrzeba (1876–1946). Biografia naukowa i polityczna. Kraków: Wydawnictwo Uniwersytetu Jagiellońskiego. 2011.
- Władysław Konopczyński (1880–1952). Człowiek i dzieło,. Kraków: Ośrodek Myśli Politycznej. 2017.
- Wacław Tokarz 1873-1937: historyk walk o niepodległość. Kraków: Księgarnia Akademicka. 2018.
- Wiktor Bazielich (1892–1963). Historyk Starego Sącza. Stary Sącz: Powiatowa i Miejsko-Gminna Biblioteka Publiczna im. Wiktora Bazielicha w Starym Sączu. 2019.
- Adam Vetulani (1901–1976). Historyk prawa polskiego i kanoniczego. Kraków: Wydawnictwo Uniwersytetu Jagiellońskiego. 2023.
- W walce o niepodległość Polski i prawa kobiet. Biografia Wandy Pełczyńskiej. Warszawa: Instytut Pileckiego. 2023.
- Józef Feldman (1899–1946) historyk dziejów nowożytnych i nowoczesnych. Kraków. 2025.
