= Law of Poland =

The Polish law or legal system in Poland has been developing since the first centuries of Polish history, over 1,000 years ago. The public and private laws of Poland are codified.

The supreme law in Poland is the Constitution of Poland. Poland is a civil law legal jurisdiction and has a civil code, the Civil Code of Poland. The Polish parliament creates legislation (law) and is made up of the Senat (upper house) and the Sejm (lower house).

== Legal areas ==
Polish public and private laws are divided into various areas, including, for example:

- civil law (prawo cywilne), much of which is contained in the Polish Civil Code
- commercial law (prawo handlowe) notably the Polish Code of Commercial Partnerships and Companies
- copyright law (prawo autorskie), see copyright law in Poland for details
- administrative law (prawo administracyjne)
- constitutional law (prawo konstytucyjne)
- private international law (prawo prywatne międzynarodowe)
- tax laws (prawo podatkowe)
- criminal law (prawo karne)
- family law (prawo rodzinne)
- labour law (prawo pracy)
- water law (prawo wodne)
- media law (prawo prasowe)
- Traffic code (prawo o ruchu drogowym)
- Geology and Mining law (Prawo geologiczne i górnicze).

New Polish law is published in Dziennik Ustaw and Monitor Polski (see promulgation).

Law in Poland is administered by the judiciary of Poland and enforced by the law enforcement in Poland.

== Company law ==
No universal definitions of company and business exist in the Polish law. The usage of the equivalent terms in the Polish legal system may often be confusing because each of them has several different definitions for various purposes.

Przedsiębiorca ('entrepreneur' or 'undertaking')—known as kupiec ('merchant') until 1964; jednostka gospodarcza('economic unit') from 1964 to 1988; podmiot gospodarczy ('economic entity') from 1988 to 1997—is the closest equivalent of company understood as an entity. As of January 2021, there are at least thirteen different definitions of entrepreneur/undertaking, enshrined in the following acts:

- the Civil Code,
- the Law of the Entrepreneurs,
- the Bankruptcy and Restructuring Law,
- the Law of Industrial Property Rights,
- the Geological and Mining Law
- Act on the National Court Register,
- Act on Protection of Competition and Consumers,
- Act on Combatting Unfair Competition,
- Act on Counteracting Unfair Market Practices,
- Act on Informing about Prices of Goods and Services,
- Act on Protection of Classified Information,
- Commission Regulation (EU) on the application of Articles 107 and 108 of the Treaty on the Functioning of the European Union to de minimis aid,
- Regulation (EU) No 952/2013 of the European Parliament and of the Council of 9 October 2013 laying down the Union Customs Code.

Przedsiębiorstwo ('enterprise') is defined in the Civil Code as an organized complex of material and non-material components designated to perform economic activity. Therefore, it is equivalent to company understood as a set of assets organized to do business.

Działalność gospodarcza ('economic activity') is the closest equivalent of business. As of January 2021, there are at least six different definitions of economic activity, enshrined in the following acts:

- the Law of the Entrepreneurs,
- the Tax Ordinance,
- Act on Personal Income Tax,
- Act on Goods and Services Tax (VAT),
- Act on Social Security System,
- Act on Procedures Concerning Public Aid (transcription of the definition developed in the EU case law).

=== Entities registered as entrepreneurs in the Central Registration and Information on Business (Centralna Ewidencja i Informacja o Działalności Gospodarczej, CEIDG) ===
- przedsiębiorca będący osobą fizyczną (an entrepreneur who is a natural person), previously known as osoba fizyczna wykonującą działalność gospodarczą or działalność gospodarcza osoby fizycznej or jednoosobowa działalność gospodarcza or kupiec jednoosobowy — sole proprietorship; the company's name must include the first name and surname of the entrepreneur;
- s.c. (spółka cywilna): "civil law partnership", itself neither a proper legal entity nor a juridical person, as it is the partners (natural persons) who retain their separate statuses as entrepreneurs and legal entities, albeit bound by an agreement on the sharing of profits, losses and ownership of a business (common pool of assets). Although it is granted NIP and REGON numbers distinct from those belonging to the partners, its legal capacity is limited exclusively to matters related to value-added tax, excise and customs duties, as well as the roles of an employer in labor law contracts and a payer for its employees (but not partners) of their personal income tax advances, social insurance contributions and health insurance contributions. Can be likened to a voluntary association. Its name must include the first names and surnames of the entrepreneurs;

=== Entities registered in the National Court Register (Krajowy Rejestr Sądowy, KRS) ===
==== Entities registered as entrepreneurs in the Register of Entrepreneurs (Rejestr przedsiębiorców), excluding the pan-EU forms ====
Except for the spółki osobowe (partnerships), all are juridical persons.

- spółki handlowe commercial/trade partnerships and companies/corporations (regulated by Code of Commercial Companies)
  - spółki osobowe partnerships (entities possessing separate juridical personality)
    - sp.j. (spółka jawna): ≈ registered partnership, otherwise translated general partnership
    - sp.p. (spółka partnerska): ≈ professional partnership, otherwise translated limited liability partnershipMay also be denoted by the addition of i partner(zy) ("and partner(s)") to the firm's name. Can only be used for the purpose of practicing as a professional licensed by a regulatory body, in a profession listed in the appropriate provision of the Commercial Companies Code (e.g. physicians, barristers). The partners are fully liable for the partnership's debts, with the exception of debts incurred by other partners practicing their licensed profession and employees under their direction.
    - sp.k. (spółka komandytowa): ≈ limited partnership
    - S.K.A. (spółka komandytowo-akcyjna): limited joint-stock partnership, otherwise translated partnership limited by shares. Minimum share capital zl 50,000 (approx. €12,500).
  - spółki kapitałowe companies/corporations
    - S.A. (spółka akcyjna): ≈ joint-stock company, otherwise translated plc (UK). Minimum share capital zl 100,000 (approx. €25,000).
    - P.S.A. (prosta spółka akcyjna) = simple joint-stock company, otherwise translated simple plc, a new company type 2021, actually a simplified version of the former type
    - Sp. z o.o. (spółka z ograniczoną odpowiedzialnością): ≈ Ltd. (UK). Minimum share capital zl 5,000 (approx. €1,250)
- spółdzielnia: ≈ cooperative (regulated by Cooperatives Act of Poland) May also be denoted by the adjective Spółdzielczy(-a/-e) in the firm's name. Some subtypes of cooperatives are governed by additional dedicated laws along the general cooperative law, these include spółdzielcza kasa oszczędnościowo-kredytowa (a credit union), bank spółdzielczy (a cooperative bank), spółdzielnia mieszkaniowa (a housing cooperative), rolnicza spółdzielnia produkcyjna (an agricultural production cooperative), spółdzielnia kółek rolniczych (a farming societies cooperative, providing agricultural services), and spółdzielnia pracy (a labor cooperative), including spółdzielnia socjalna (a social cooperative).
- p.p. (przedsiębiorstwo państwowe): state undertakings or state enterprise
- instytut badawczy: (government research institute, excluding those operated by the Polish Academy of Sciences),
- instytut Sieci Badawczej Łukasiewicz (Łukasiewicz Research Network institute)
- przedsiębiorstwo zagraniczne (foreign undertaking),
- towarzystwo ubezpieczeń wzajemnych (mutual insurance society),
- towarzystwo reasekuracji wzajemnej (mutual reinsurance society)
- branches of foreign undertakings active on the territory of Poland,
- main branches of foreign insurance undertakings,
- main branches of foreign reinsurance undertakings
- as well as any of the juridical persons registered in the Register of Associations, Other Social and Professional Organizations, Foundations and Independent Public Healthcare Institutions (see below) if they intend to perform business activities (when allowed by their bylaws, excluding Independent Public Healthcare Institutions, as they are not allowed to register as an entrepreneur, as well as excluding those of juridical persons or other legal entities who are registered in the KRS exclusively for the purpose of obtaining status of an officially recognized charity – public benefit organization, and would otherwise be exempt from the registration in the KRS – see below)

From business perspective spółki z ograniczoną odpowiedzialnością (limited liability companies) are the most popular forms of legal entities in Poland as approx. 96% of foreign investments is performed in this legal form.

==== Entities registered in the Register of Associations, Other Social and Professional Organizations, Foundations and Independent Public Healthcare Institutions (Rejestr stowarzyszeń, innych organizacji społecznych i zawodowych, fundacji oraz samodzielnych publicznych zakładów opieki zdrowotnej) ====
All the following types are juridical persons:

- fundacja (foundation); Polish law currently envisages only public purpose foundations
- stowarzyszenie rejestrowe (registered association)
- związek stowarzyszeń (union of associations),
- territorial branches of an association who have their own juridical personality (if allowed by the association's bylaws),
- stowarzyszenie ogrodowe family garden association
- związek stowarzyszeń ogrodowych (union of family garden associations),
- stowarzyszenie kultury fizycznej (physical culture association)
- związek sportowy (sport union = a union of physical culture associations),
- polski związek sportowy (Polish sport union), a sui generis juridical person holding the authority of the officially recognized national sports governing body in disciplines which are managed by an IOC-recognized international federation (all Olympic and some established non-Olympic disciplines, but not the Paralympic ones, the latter obligated to operate under the general rules as unions of associations because of their non-commercial and often charitable character); each discipline is always governed by one such body only though some of the latter cover multiple disciplines; this highly regulated legal form may be described as based on a union of associations entrusted with the status of a national sports governing body on behalf of the respective international federation and the state authorities, thus exhibiting also some features of an official authority, but also of a company, as it is designated by law as the obligatory owner and trader of exclusive rights related to sponsorship, advertisement and broadcasting of national events and national team, and therefore, it is indirectly obligated (in practice in all cases) to register also as an entrepreneur; its incorporation is possible only through transforming an existing union of associations whose direct membership is composed exclusively of sports clubs active in a specific sport, as well as their subnational unions, or other juridical persons active in the particular discipline, and following the mandatory prior admission of such Union to the respective international federation, and subsequently, the mandatory consent of the minister responsible for sports before applying to the KRS; registration is synonymous with official recognition as the national governing body of a discipline and is coupled with a number of additional rights and obligations
- związek zawodowy (trade union) as well as their federations and confederations, as well as territorial branches of a trade union who have their own juridical personality if allowed by the trade union's bylaws),
- organizations of employers (and their unions, federations and confederations),
- organizations of economic self government (chambers of industry and commerce, Polish Chamber of Commerce, guilds and chambers of craft, Polish Union of Craft, and chambers of agriculture),
- organizations of professional self government of certain entrepreneurs (trade and services unions for entrepreneurs active in trade, gastronomy or services, excluding those acknowledged as craft or those exercising a profession governed by a regulatory college; transportation unions for entrepreneurs active in transportation; federations of the former two),
- various types of agricultural unions (trade unions of individual farmers, farming societies and their unions, sectoral agricultural organisations and their unions)
- samodzielny publiczny zakład opieki zdrowotnej (independent public healthcare institution) – a sui generis type of juridical persons, mandatory for the majority of public healthcare entities (hospitals, clinics etc.) established by the State Treasury, a territorial self-government unit, or a public higher education institution, except for entities operating as a trade partnership (a limited liability company or a joint-stock company, whose absolute majority of shares or stocks is held by the State Treasury, a territorial self government unit or a public higher education institution), or those operating as a budgetary unit, on behalf either of the State Treasury (including centers for forensic psychiatry, units of the State Sanitary Inspection, as well as some of the healthcare entities operated by a uniformed service, and a few addiction treatment centers and nursing homes operated directly by the Ministry of Health, mainly due to historical reasons) or of a self-government unit (all voivodeship centres for occupational medicine, a dozen communal rehabilitation centers or nursing homes, and three communal GP clinics).

In addition, any juridical persons or other legal entities (including those originally or otherwise exempt from the registration in the KRS – see below) also have to register, if they apply for and obtain the status of an officially recognized charity (organizacja pożytku publicznego = public benefit organization), when eligible; however, as an exception, registration solely for that purpose neither confers juridical personality to entities lacking one, nor does it create obligation or right to register as an entrepreneur.

=== Entities excluded from registration as entrepreneurs ===
Types of entities excluded from registration as entrepreneurs include the following.

==== Natural persons ====
- Działalność pozarejestrowa osoby fizycznej (non-registered activity of a natural person): unless explicitly stated in a sector-specific particular act, unregulated activity of a natural person is not considered “fully fledged” economic activity, thus being entitled to exemption from registration in the CEIDG, if the person has not performed business activities during the preceding 60 months and the monthly gross income generated by the activity does not exceed 50% of the minimum wage. Such activity is also free from the obligation to pay social insurance contributions, nevertheless, it is still subject to taxation and health insuranće contributions. Individual prostitution is in all cases excluded from registration, unregulated, untaxed and not subject to compulsory social or health insurance, whereas organised prostitution is illegal.
- Kancelaria komornicza (an office of a judicial enforcement officer commonly known as bailiff) – a court bailiff is a public official (but not a civil servant) who is assigned to undertake enforcement action within the area of the jurisdiction of a single regional court; it is an individual who is appointed to act as such by the minister of justice on application of the person concerned, filed via the intermediary of the president of the court of appeal, within whose area the candidate intends to perform acts in enforcement proceedings. Before appointing, the minister of justice shall request the council of the chamber of the court bailiffs to give the opinion of the candidate. A bailiffs is not employed by the court in spite of acting on behalf of its authority, but is self-employed and operates an own single chancellery (named Bailiff's Office of the Regional Court in...), a quasi-undertaking excluded from registration as an entrepreneur in CEIDG, but treated as such for most other purposes, including income taxation or social and health insurance, obligated to obtain NIP and REGON numbers by registering in the respective registers, and is remunerated by percentage on money recovered and the other fees specified in The Court Bailiffs and Enforcement Act of 20 August 1997. The bailiff also incurs expenses, to be covered by the debtor or by the creditor if the enforcement proceedings are ineffective.
- Biuro poselskie, senatorskie lub posła do Parlamentu Europejskiego (a constituency office of a Sejm deputy, a senator, or a member of European Parliament) – it is the elected official himself who personally acts as the employer of staff in the office, he/she uses own PESEL number instead of obtaining NIP for the purposes of paying employees′ income tax or health and social insurance contributions, but is obligated to obtain a REGON number for the office; the office is financed exclusively from funds assigned by the chancellery of the respective parliamentary chamber and may not perform economic activity
- Gospodarstwo rolne rolnika indywidualnego (agricultural holding of an individual farmer): proper agricultural activity of an individual farmer animal husbandry; inland fisheries; plant production, including crop cultivation, vegetable farming, horticulture, orchard farming, fungiculture, seed production, plant nursery, forestry) is excluded from registration as entrepreneur (but a farmer is still obligated to obtain NIP and REGON numbers by registering in the respective registers, as well as to obtain in most cases registration in the Register of Producers, Agricultural Holdings and Applications for Payment Entitlements, the latter being obligatory for all holders of pigs, cattle, goats or sheep, and a prerequisite to receive any public state or EU funding). Proper agricultural activity is exempt from income and real estate taxes, being subject to much more lenient agricultural tax instead. Such farmer is obligated to pay agricultural social and health insurance contributions subsidized by the state, instead of paying much higher regular social and health insurance contributions. A farmer may also produce certain amount of liquid biofuels for own use, after registering in a dedicated Register of Farmers Producing Biofuels for Their Own Use, and in the Central Register of Excise Entities as a (token amount) excise taxpayer, but without the obligation to register as VAT taxpayer. Certain other types of individual farmer's economic activities performed on a limited scale (agri-tourism, direct-to-consumer sales of own products at the farm or at marketplaces, winemaking out of own crops) may also be performed without registering as an entrepreneur, unless he/she decides otherwise, and unless such income does not exceed certain limits; such farmer may also retain the right to participate in the preferentiaL agricultural social insurance system if he has been covered by it for at least three years preceding initiation of an additional activity and intends to continue proper agricultural production; however, land and buildings used for such additional activities are subject to standard real estate tax, instead of agricultural tax;
  - in case of agri-tourism or direct-to-consumer sales of own products at the farm or at marketplaces, the farmer may remain exempt from income tax and may choose whether or not to become a VAT taxpayer; in the case of agri-tourism, a limit of five rooms is also applicable;
  - in the case of winemaking, the production is subject to income tax, VAT and excise (albeit at preferential rates); an annual production volume quota of 10000 liters is also applicable);
- Jednostka systemu oświaty prowadzona przez osobę fizyczną (a school or an educational institution other than a higher education institution, operated by a natural person)

==== Juridical persons and other collective legal entities, excluding the pan-EU forms ====
Certain types of juridical persons or other collective legal entities which have been established otherwise than by registration in the KRS, may in few situations be authorized by law to perform business activity (sometimes of a limited scope and/or scale, along with their main, often non-commercial or not-for-profit activity), despite remaining excluded and exempt from the obligation to register in the KRS, but are still obligated (except for the State Treasury as a whole) to obtain NIP and REGON numbers by registering in the relevant registers, and are usually still subject to the general taxation rules (including VAT); examples of such situations include:

- spółka wodna (a water corporation) – a not-for-profit water law corporation and a juridical person, incorporated to provide water services to its shareholders, usually in a rural or suburban setting, registered by the local starosta, while a union of such entities is registered by the voivode;
- związek wałowy (a levee union) – a similar not-for-profit corporation and a juridical person, incorporated to construct and manage a levee, registered by the local starosta, while a union of such entities is registered by the voivode;
- spółka dla zagospodarowania wspólnoty gruntowej (a common land management corporation) – a similar not-for-profit corporation and a juridical person, incorporated to manage common land, registered by the local starosta
- fundacja rodzinna (a family foundation)
- koło łowieckie (a hunting club) – a juridical person incorporated by its members to manage game on a certain territory (hunting circuit) leased from the state, legally allowed to perform business activities related to its statutory tasks; according to the Act on Hunting Law, it acquires juridical personality through registration by the respective district board of the Polski Związek Łowiecki (Polish Hunting Association, itself also a juridical person and a quango, actually a modified, highly regulated union of associations exempt from registration in the KRS)
- koło gospodyń wiejskich (a rural women's association) and their unions – in accord with a dedicated act, they acquire juridical personality by registering in the National Register of the Rural Women's Associations maintained by the Agency for Modernisation and Restructuring of Agriculture
- uczelnia (a higher education institution, regardless whether public or private) – may perform business activity organized as a separate part of its own juridical personality (or as a separate juridical person e.g. a limited liability partnership or a joint-stock partnership). According to the Act on Law on Higher Education and Science, a private institution may only be founded by a natural person or by a juridical person (other than a state or a self-governmental juridical person); it comes into existence through registration by the Minister of Science and Higher Education and acquires its own juridical personality which is distinct from the founding entity's one; however, a slightly different procedure concerns the private ecclesiastical institutions which acquire juridical personality in the same way as other juridical persons created by a church or an other confessional community (see below) but require the Ministry's approval to award state-recognised diplomas. On the other hand, a public institution is established through an act of Parliament or by a regulation of the Minister of Science and Higher Education, and therefore, its existence as a legal person does not depend on registration anywhere;
- osoby prawne i jednostki organizacyjne nieposiadające osobowości prawnej utworzone przez kościół lub inną wspólnotę wyznaniową (juridical persons or legal entities lacking juridical personality which have been created by a church or an other confessional community recognized by the state) – they are established and (in the case of juridical persons) acquire juridical personality through a regulation of the minister competent for religious confessions, or (in the case of territorial or personal institutions of the Catholic Church in Poland) by notifying the Polish government by the relevant church authority, that an ecclesiastical juridical person (such as a parish or a diocese) or other legal entity has been established in accord with the canon law; such entities may be allowed to perform business activities by their bylaws, and are registered by the Ministry of Interior and Administration in the detailed part of the Register of Churches and Other Confessional Communities; exceptions include religious foundations and religious associations of lay people, both subject to standard KRS registration under general rules, albeit with some oversight authority awarded to a church or an other confessional community;
- instytut naukowy Polskiej Akademii Nauk (a research institute of the Polish Academy of Sciences) – created as a juridical person by registration in the dedicated register maintained by the academy (itself also a juridical person and a quango – a regulated body combining features of a learned society with a statutory membership cap, a regulatory college and a corporation, itself also exempt from registration in the KRS),
- partia polityczna (a political party) – it is created and becomes a juridical person through registration on the List of Political Parties. The list is not a part of the KRS and it is maintained by the District Court in Warsaw. Political parties in Poland are generally banned from performing economic activities; they may, however, perform certain minor activities, such as minor office services, selling promotional items with party logo, selling publications concerning its manifesto, its political agenda, its bylaws and its activities.
- fundusz emerytalny (a pension fund) – either otwarty fundusz emerytalny (open pension fund), pracowniczy fundusz emerytalny (employees' pension fund) or dobrowolny fundusz emerytalny (voluntary pension fund) – it is created on permission of the Polish Financial Supervision Authority and becomes a juridical person through registration in the Register of Pension Funds. The register is not a part of the KRS and it is maintained by the District Court in Warsaw.
- fundusz inwestycyjny (an investment fund) – either fundusz inwestycyjny otwarty (open investment fund), specjalistyczny fundusz inwestycyjny otwarty (specialist open investment fund), or fundusz inwestycyjny zamknięty(closed investment fund); it is created on permission of the Polish Financial Supervision Authority and becomes a juridical person through registration in the Register of Investment Funds. The register is not a part of the KRS and it is maintained by the District Court in Warsaw.
- jednostka doradztwa rolniczego (a farm advice unit) – a state juridical person established by the act on farm advice units
- wojewódzki ośrodek ruchu drogowego (a voivodeship centre for road traffic) – a juridical person subordinate to the self-government of a voivodeship, responsible for conducting tests for driving licenses in all categories, tests for special traffic qualifications, as well as for traffic safety education and promotion; they are legally permitted to conduct not-for-profit economic activity;
- park narodowy (a national park) — a state juridical person established by a regulation of the Council of Ministers, authorized by law to perform economic activity, unless it contravenes the Act on the Conservation of Nature,
- wspólnota mieszkaniowa (a homeowner community) – a legal entity lacking juridical personality or a dedicated register, established ipso iure without any registration procedures in buildings or building complexes with at least one separate owner-occupancy delimited; such a community is required to obtain NIP and REGON and to maintain simplified accounting documentation and a bank account; also subject to company income tax, in contrast to the real estate tax which is paid directly by its members; may perform activities outside the scope of its obligatory core responsibilities, including activities related to lending out parts of common areas of the real estate, or parts of advertising-suitable surfaces such as siding or fencing, becoming in such situations a VAT taxpayer; a community in a building or a building complex with four or more separate owner-occupancies delimited is required to elect a managing board, or to select and contract a professional real-estate manager;
- wspólnota gruntowa (a common land community) – a similar legal entity lacking juridical personality or a dedicated register, established ipso iure for the management of common land, unless a dedicated common land management partnership (a juridical person) has been incorporated instead (see above);
- publiczna jednostka systemu oświaty (a public school or educational institution other than a higher education institution) – a legal entity lacking juridical personality, established and registered by an organ of the government or a territorial self-government unit
- stowarzyszenie zwykłe (a common/simple/ordinary association) – registered by the local starosta, a legal entity lacking juridical personality, less formalized compared to a registered association (which is a juridical person registered in the KRS)
- uczniowski klub sportowy (a schoolchildren's sport club) and inny niż uczniowski klub sportowy działający w formie stowarzyszenia, którego statut nie przewiduje prowadzenia działalności gospodarczej (sport club other than a schoolchildren's sport club which operates as an association whose bylaws do not foresee economic activity) – both are technically associations registered by a local starosta instead of the KRS, but nevertheless acquire as an exception juridical personality, though are not authorized to undertake economic activity
- samorząd zawodu zaufania publicznego (a regulatory college), a public-law corporation constituting the self-governmental regulatory body for a certain profession (designated in such case a public confidence profession) or their pair with membership mandatory for every professional, established in each case through an act of Parliament, depending on profession either as a single one-tier national body or as a two-tier system of a number of territorial bodies united in a national body
- państwowa lub samorządowa instytucja kultury (a state or a (territorial) self-governmental cultural institution) – a juridical person such as a museum, a theatre, a musical theatre, a ballet, an opera house, a philharmonica, a cameral or a symphony orchestra, a folk song and dance ensemble, an art gallery or a public library (created and registered by a minister or a territorial self-government unit) – even though the main (cultural/artistic) activity of a public cultural institution is not legally regarded as business activity, an institution may be allowed to perform additional business activity, if its bylaws state so;
- jednostka samorządu terytorialnego: gmina, powiat, województwo (a territorial self-government unit: municipality=gmina, county=powiat), province=voivodeship) – a juridical person established by a regulation or (in the case of voivodeship) by an act of Parliament;
- związek międzygminny, powiatów lub powiatowo-gminny (an inter-municipal union, a union of counties, or a municipal-county union) – juridical person registered by the Minister of the Interior, incorporated to carry out specific services on behalf of member municipalities and/or counties);
- bank państwowy (a state bank) – established as a juridical person by a regulation of the Council of Ministers (in the interwar period, by the President of the Republic; dominant type of banks during the times of communism; nowadays, this status is restricted to national development banks; only one exists as of 1 December 2020; the Bank Gospodarstwa Krajowego;
- Narodowy Bank Polski (National Bank of Poland) (established by the Constitution of Poland, granted juridical personality by the Act governing it)
- kluby i koła – caucuses in the Sejm and the Senate (called clubs when grouping ≥15 members or circles if grouping 3–14 members) – legally they are quangos, entities lacking juridical personality, operating on behalf of the State Treasury, but may enter into work contracts as an employer, sue and be sued in a labour court, and are obligated to obtain NIP and REGON numbers by registering in the relevant registers
  - kluby i koła poselskie – clubs and circles of (Sejm) deputies
  - kluby i koła senatorskie – clubs and circles of senators
  - kluby i koła parlamentarne – parliamentary (joint cross-chamber) clubs and circles – of both (Sejm) deputies and senators
- selected other state juridical persons e.g. civilian technical inspection units (Office of Technical Inspection, Transportation Technical Supervision), Polish Waters National Water Management Holding; Polish Air Navigation Agency, National Health Fund, Social Insurance Institution, State Fund for Rehabilitation of Disabled Persons, National Fund of Environment Protection and voivodeship funds for environment protection, Polish Film Institute.
- selected state (statio fisci) or self-governmental legal entities other than legal persons: budgetary units: e.g. State Forests National Forest Holding, Agricultural Social Insurance Fund, statistical offices and the Central Statistical Office, units of various state uniformed services, state inspections and their laboratories – operating on behalf of the State Treasury or the parent territorial self-government unit;
- Skarb Państwa (the State Treasury) – the juridical person impersonating the state and its government apparatus (with some exceptions enumerated above), established by the Civil Code; itself, it is not assigned NIP and REGON numbers, as they are assigned to its organizational units (statio fisci)

Some of the abovementioned types of entities (e.g. hunting clubs, church entities), other than the state or self-governmental ones, may nevertheless be subject to registration in the KRS exclusively for the purpose of official recognition as a charity (public benefit organization – see above), if they are eligible for, apply for and obtain such.

== See also ==
- Lawyers in Poland
- Legal systems of the world
- List of law faculties in Poland
