= Mecenas =

Mecenas is a conventional courtesy title in modern Polish used to address individuals performing legal professions or authorized to represent others in court. This title is exclusive to Poland.

In the 16th century, lawyers were called "procuratores mercenarii," meaning "paid legal representatives," distinguishing them from "non-professional" representatives referred to as "procuratores." Most sources agree that the term "Mecenas" comes from Gaius Maecenas, an important patron for the poets Horace and Virgil. Another theory is that it evolved from "procuratores mercenarii," with the first part and the "r" sound in the second word being eliminated. It was already in use in the 18th century and became widespread in the 19th century.

The title of "Mecenas" is purely a courtesy title and is not legally protected. It is most often applied to the most common legal professions: advocates (adwokat), attorneys-at-law (radca prawny), and also to trainees (aplikanci) in the respective advocate and attorney-at-law programs. Nowadays, it is also used for professionals in newer legal fields, such as tax advisors (a profession created in 1996), patent attorneys (established in 2001), restructuring advisors (created in 2016 with amendments to the Civil Procedure Code, Art. 87), and legal advisors in the Prosecutor's Office of the Republic of Poland (created in 2005). Additionally, it is used in legislative work to refer to legislators.

The title may also be used for law graduates, even without completing the training program, though this practice is rarer. In 2014, the Press Office of the National Bar Council of Advocates urged that the title "Mecenas" be reserved only for advocates and attorneys-at-law, but this had no effect on the practices of the media and legal community.

== See also ==
- Lawyers in Poland
