= Legacoop =

Cooperative federation in Italy

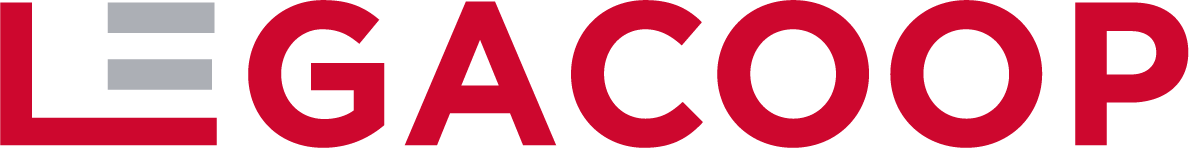

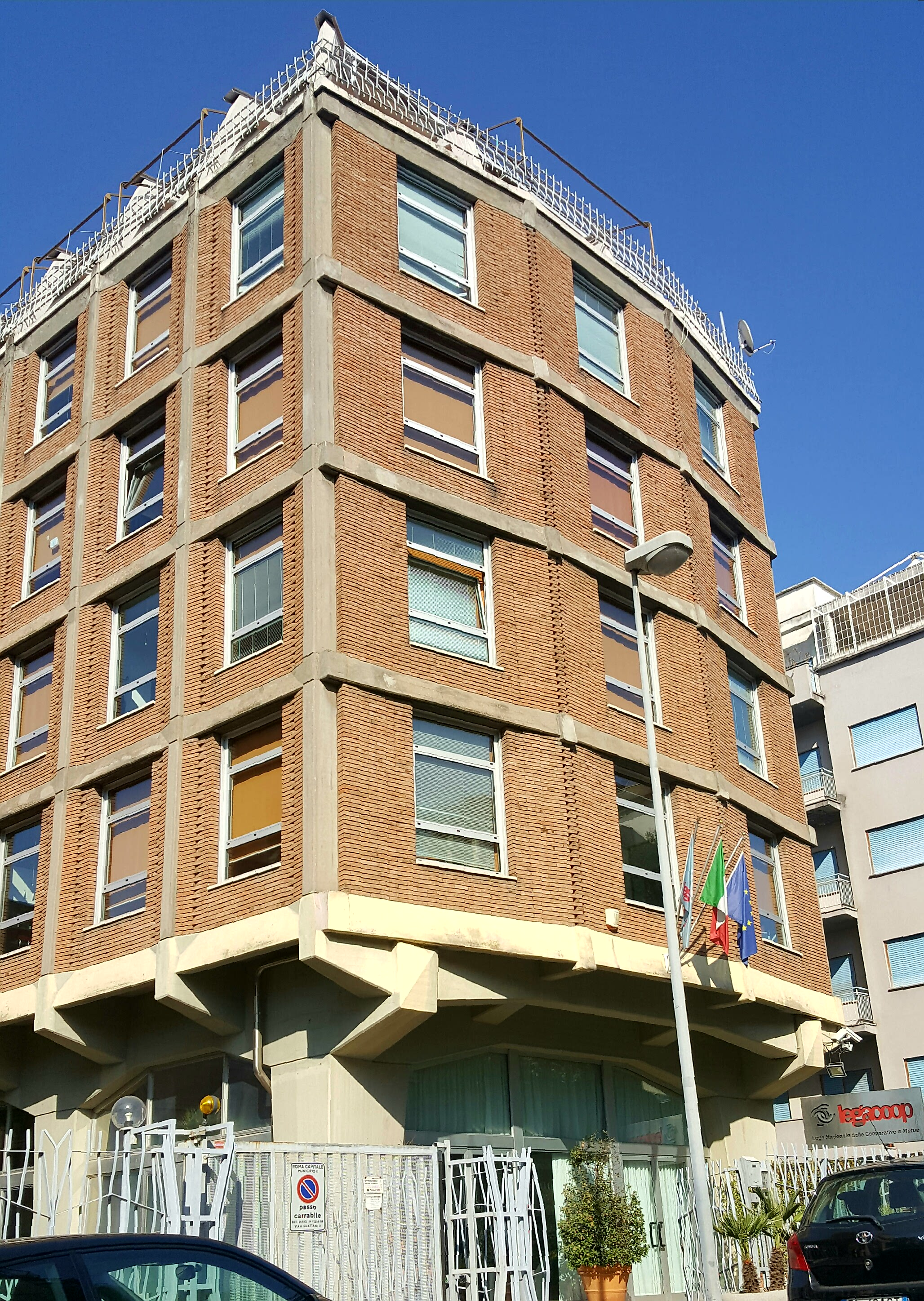
- Headquarters at Via Guattani, Rome
- Type: Cooperative Federation
- Founded: 1886
- Headquarters: Rome, Lazio, Italy
- Website: legacoop.coop

Legacoop (Lega Nazionale delle Cooperative e Mutue) is the oldest cooperative federation in Italy. Legacoop consists of several associations of cooperatives, providing coordination and advocating on behalf of its more than 10,000 associated cooperative enterprises, active throughout Italy and across the entire production chain.

== History ==
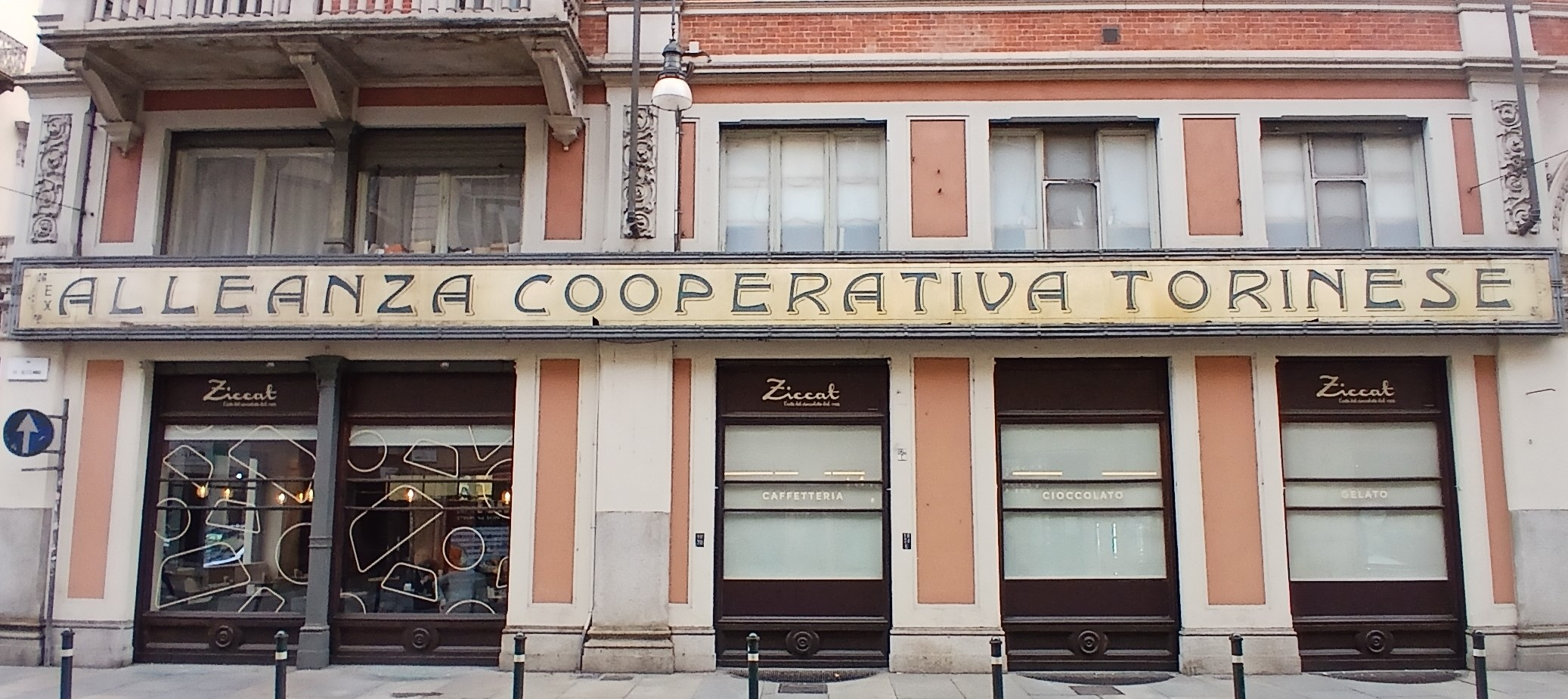
Historic cooperative frontage, Turin

The Federazione Nazionale delle Cooperative was founded in 1886 in Milan by delegates representing cooperative enterprises. In 1893, the federation changed its name to Lega delle Cooperative. At the time the federation included Catholic groups in solidarity with secular/socialist groups. In 1919, the Catholic cooperatives split and formed the Confederazione delle Cooperative Italiane. In the 1920s, the fascist government disposed of cooperatives and unions and the organization was disbanded.

After World War II, Legacoop reformed. Article 45 of the Italian Constitution recognized the social role of cooperatives as based on mutuality and non-profit goals, and involved the government in promoting its development. Cooperatives have flourished in Italy since and are a widespread presence nationwide.

Legacoop was among the founding members of the International Cooperative Alliance and actively participates in various European cooperative networks. Since 2016, it has organized the Biennale dell’Economia Cooperativa, the main public event in Italy dedicated to discussion and debate on the cooperative economy. The Biennale brings together national and international representatives from institutions and politics, as well as economists, scholars, cultural figures, and media professionals.

== Structure ==
Legacoop is organized with both a territorial and a sectoral structure, under the coordination of a national headquarters based in Rome. The territorial structure includes regional and subregional branches, ensuring representation and support across the country. The sectoral structure consists of autonomous associations that group cooperatives according to their specific market sector or type of activity.

=== ANCC Coop ===
The National Association of Consumer Cooperatives (ANCC Coop) was set up in 1957 to organize strategic and planning management for consumer cooperatives. The ANCC Coop creates marketing policy as well as consumer and environmental safety initiatives.

=== ANCD ===
The National Association of Retailer Cooperatives (ANCD) is an association of retailers' cooperatives formed in 1973 by the Consorzio Nazionale Conad and other cooperatives. ANCD represents about 4000 retailers, many under the names Conad (supermarkets), Margherita, and E. Leclerc Conad (hypermarkets – a joint venture with the French chain E.Leclerc).

=== CulTurMedia ===
CulTurMedia represents cooperatives active in three main fields: Culture, Tourism, and Communication/Media as the successor of Mediacoop, founded in 2004 to represent journalist, publishing and communication cooperatives.

=== FIMIV ===
The Italian Federation of Voluntary Integrated Mutuality (FIMIV) was founded in 1900 and includes 100 mutual assistance companies.

=== Legacoop Abitanti ===
The National Association of Housing Cooperatives was founded in 1961. Its membership includes 3000 housing cooperatives throughout Italy with a membership of over 300,000. Legacoop Abitanti promotes projects involving new construction, urban recovery, and ecobuilding.

=== Legacoop Agroalimentare ===
The National Association of Agri-Food Cooperatives for Rural Development was founded in 1957 and represents agricultural cooperatives throughout Italy.

=== Legacoop Produzione e Servizi ===
Founded in 2018 from the merger of Legacoop Servizi and Ancpl, it nowadays represents the Legacoop workers' cooperatives active in productions and services.

=== Legacoopsociali ===
Legacoopsociali organizes and represents the social cooperatives. Established in 2005, the association includes 1,550 social cooperatives.

=== Sanicoop ===
Established in 2012, it is the federation of Legacoop cooperatives of doctors and healthcare workers rto represent healthcare and medical cooperatives.
