= The Paris Architect =

2013 novel by Charles Belfoure

- Author: Charles Belfoure
- Language: English
- Genre: Historical, thriller
- Publisher: Sourcebooks Landmark
- Publication date: October 8, 2013
- Publication place: United States
- Media type: Print, e-book, audiobook
- Pages: 384 pages
- ISBN: 1402284314

The Paris Architect is a 2013 novel by Charles Belfoure and the author's debut in fiction writing. Published by Sourcebooks Landmark, it follows the story of French architect Lucien Bernard, who is paid to create temporary hiding places for Jews in Nazi-occupied Paris. The book reached The New York Times best seller list in July 2015.

== Background ==
An architect specializing in historic preservation, Charles Belfoure had written several non-fiction books on architecture, including works on the history of American banks and rowhouse architecture in Baltimore before writing The Paris Architect. He decided to try writing fiction, thinking it might be a break from his everyday work. A direct inspiration was his discovery that during the reign of Elizabeth I in England special spaces were designed in houses as temporary hiding places for repressed Catholic priests.

== Release ==
The novel was first published in hardcover in the United States on October 8, 2013. Unabridged audible version narrated by Mark Bramhall was released that same year. A paperback edition was released in the U.S. on July 15, 2014. The Paris Architect was released in the United Kingdom by Allison & Busby on August 5, 2015 and in Australia by Pan Macmillan Australia on January 31, 2017.

The book was translated and published in several languages, including Italian (2014), Hebrew (2014), Hungarian (2015), Turkish (2015), Portuguese (2015), Bulgarian (2015), Polish (2015), Norwegian (2016), Romanian (2017) and Czech (2019).

== Plot summary ==
During World War II Lucien Bernard, an architect living in Paris, France, is offered a large fee to design hiding places for Jews being hunted by the Nazis. He desperately needs the money to make a living, although he knows that if caught, he will most likely be killed.

== Reception ==
The book received generally favorable reviews. It was presented by USA Today in the “New Voices” section and was an American Booksellers Association Indie Pick in October 2013.

Malcolm Gladwell of The Guardian chose The Paris Architect his favorite book of 2013, calling it “a beautiful and elegant account of an ordinary man's unexpected and reluctant descent into heroism during the second world war”.

Vicki Briner of Library Journal wrote that Belfoure's portrayal of Vichy France “is both disturbing and captivating, and his beautiful tale demonstrates that while human beings are capable of great atrocities, they have a capacity for tremendous acts of courage as well”. New York Post picked the novel as a “must-read”.

The Paris Architect was among finalists of the 2015 International Dublin Literary Award and was listed The New York Times best seller list in an e-book category in July 2015. It was also ranked #102 on Best-Selling Books Top 150 list of USA Today on December 6, 2015.

Until the first half of 2020, The Paris Architect has sold nearly 400,000 copies.

== Film adaptation ==
In July 2016 it was announced that StudioCanal and The Picture Company acquired the rights to film The Paris Architect. Chris Salmanpour was hired to adapt the script.
