= Legal advisor (Poland) =

Legal advisor (Polish: doradca prawny) is a legal profession recognized in the Polish legal system. Legal advisors are lawyers providing legal services, not affiliated with any law society or bar association. Practising legal advisors do not have to possess a practising certificate and their activity is based on the principle of economic freedom guaranteed in Polish entrepreneurial law.

== Qualifications ==
Only lawyers can be legal advisors, i.e., persons with higher legal education, Magister degree in law (Polish: magister prawa; Latin: Magister iuris). According to Polish legal doctrine, a lawyer should be understood as a person who graduated from law school with the aforementioned degree, even if such a person does not practice law after graduation. A legal advisor may provide legal counselling and draft legal documents, possess power of attorney in administrative proceedings and particular civil cases if a legal advisor is bound by a permanent contract of commission with a client.

The status of legal advisors is not regulated by law, and they are governed by corporate law. Unlike advocates and attorneys-at-law, legal advisors are not obliged to hold liability insurance but may choose voluntary liability insurance. In the absence of a self-regulatory body, legal advisors are not bound by binding rules of professional ethics and are not subject to disciplinary responsibility. They are also not bound by professional secrecy or permitted to refuse to testify to facts of which they become aware in the course of providing their legal services.

== Constitutional Tribunal ruling (2003) ==
In the justification of the judgment of the Constitutional Tribunal of 26 November 2003 in case SK 22/02, the view was expressed that the provisions in force in Poland allow persons with higher legal education to provide legal counselling. The plaintiff was a lawyer, a law graduate of the Faculty of Law and Administration of the Jagiellonian University. Since 1992 plaintiff had been carrying on business within the scope defined in the entry in the Business Activity Register as legal counselling (excluding legal services dedicated to attorneys-at-law and advocates), accepting powers of attorney, drafting documents, conducting commissioned cases, and representing clients in front of various public authorities. By a ruling of the collegium of misdemeanours in 1999, the applicant was fined and found guilty of providing legal counselling without the required admission to practice law. In 1999 this ruling was upheld by a judgment of the district court. In its decision of 12 November 2001 (IV KKN 145/00), the Supreme Court dismissed the cassation appeal against the above judgment as unfounded.

The plaintiff brought a constitutional complaint. The Court examined the case with the participation of the plaintiff, the Sejm and the General Prosecutor, and five constitutional judges. The Court upheld the constitutional complaint and declared one of the challenged provisions of the Code of Criminal Offences to be inconsistent with Article 42 of the Constitution of the Republic of Poland. As a consequence of the judgment, the economic activity of providing legal counselling carried out by persons with higher legal education but not belonging to bar associations, was legally sanctioned.

In the following years, the Constitutional Tribunal in its judgment of 19 April 2006 (K 6/06) concerning the Act on Advocates and in its judgment of 8 November 2006 (K 30/06) concerning the Act on Attorneys-at-Law challenged the compatibility with these laws with the Constitution of the Republic of Poland. In the opinion of the Supreme Court (V CZ 32/07), the provisions challenged by the Constitutional Tribunal raised constitutional objections not because they provided for the possibility of providing legal counselling by persons not being advocates or attorneys-at-law, but due to inadequate placement of those provisions in the indicated Acts.

== See also ==
- Diplom-Jurist (Dipl.-Jur.) − holders of the German degree may work as lawyers in legal professions where the practising certificate is not required (e.g. in-house counsel).
