= Aristeo Banchi =

- Born: 22 February 1907; Grosseto, Kingdom of Italy
- Died: 7 December 1995 (aged 88); Grosseto, Italy
- Other name: Ganna
- Occupations: Baker, political activist

Aristeo Banchi (22 February 1907 – 7 December 1995), known by the partisan name Ganna, was an Italian communist activist and partisan leader active in the Italian Resistance during World War II.

== Life and career ==
Banchi was born in Grosseto, Italy, on 22 February 1907. He worked as a baker alongside his father and became politically active at a young age, joining the clandestine organization of the Italian Communist Party in the province of Grosseto.

Due to his anti-fascist activities, Banchi was arrested by the Fascist authorities on 25 September 1930 and sentenced to two years' imprisonment in Viterbo. After his release, he remained under police surveillance. In June 1940 he was sent to internal exile in Sant'Angelo dei Lombardi, where he remained until 1943.

After the fall of the Fascist regime in 1943 and the subsequent German occupation of Italy, Banchi joined the Italian Resistance. On 9 September 1943, he participated in the first meeting in Grosseto that laid the foundations for the formation of the local National Liberation Committee. Using the nom de guerre "Ganna", he became a commander in the Garibaldi Brigade "Antonio Gramsci", a partisan formation active in the Maremma area. During the night of 14–15 June 1944, Banchi assumed command of the partisan forces in Grosseto, a city located along the route of the German "aggressive retreat" northward following the liberation of Rome on 5 June. He distributed weapons to the local fighters and took control of the main municipal buildings. The following morning, German SS units approaching from the south clashed with partisans. The battle resulted in six partisan deaths, twelve German fatalities, and thirty German prisoners. Grosseto's citizens raised a white flag to signal the city's liberation to the approaching Allies.

After World War II, Banchi continued to participate in political and cultural activities linked to the communist movement. In 1993 he published Si va pel mondo. Il partito comunista a Grosseto dalle origini al 1944, a memoir documenting the early history of the Communist movement in Grosseto and the anti-fascist struggle in the province.

Banchi died in Grosseto on 7 December 1995. His personal papers, including manuscripts and documents relating to his political activity between 1921 and 1945, are preserved at the institute of contemporary history ISGREC.

== Works ==
- Si va pel mondo. Il partito comunista a Grosseto dalle origini al 1944 (Grosseto: ARCI, 1993)

== In fiction ==
The "baker Banchi" is mentioned in Luciano Bianciardi's novel Il lavoro culturale (1957) among the communist heroes who inspired the protagonist, and who, by fighting against the fascists, liberated the city where the novel is set (nicknamed "Kansas City").
