= Stanisław Kutrzeba =

Polish historian and politician

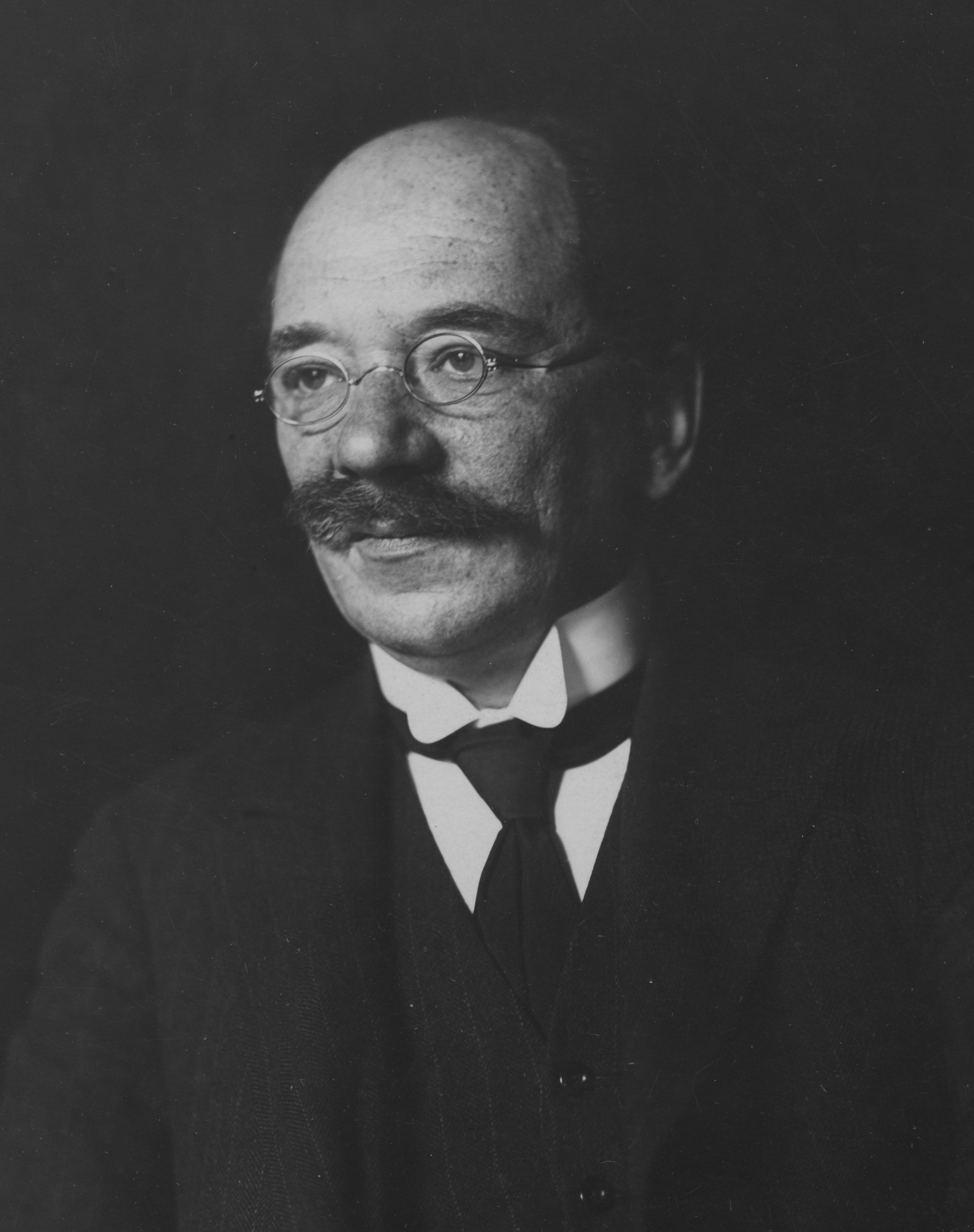
- Stanisław Kutrzeba
- Born: Stanisław Marian Kutrzeba; 15 November 1876; Kraków
- Died: 7 January 1946 (aged 69); Kraków
- Citizenship: Polish
- Education: Jagiellonian University
- Occupation: historian
- Known for: professor at Jagiellonian University, general secretary, president of the Polish Academy of Arts and Sciences

Stanisław Marian Kutrzeba (1876–1946) was a Polish historian and politician who was Professor of the Jagiellonian University from 1908, and then until the end of his life the Chair of Studies in Polish law. He was chair of the Law Department (1913/1914, 1920/1921), university's rector (1932/33), General Secretary of Polish Academy of Learning (1926–39) and its president (1939–1946). He was one of many professors of Jagiellonian University arrested by Nazis during Sonderaktion Krakau in 1939 and imprisoned in the Sachsenhausen concentration camp. After being freed in 1940, he took part in the underground education. In 1945, he was deputy to the State National Council.

His works in the area of history were centered on the history of Polish law, the history of Poland from 14th to 18th centuries and the history of Kraków.

== Life ==
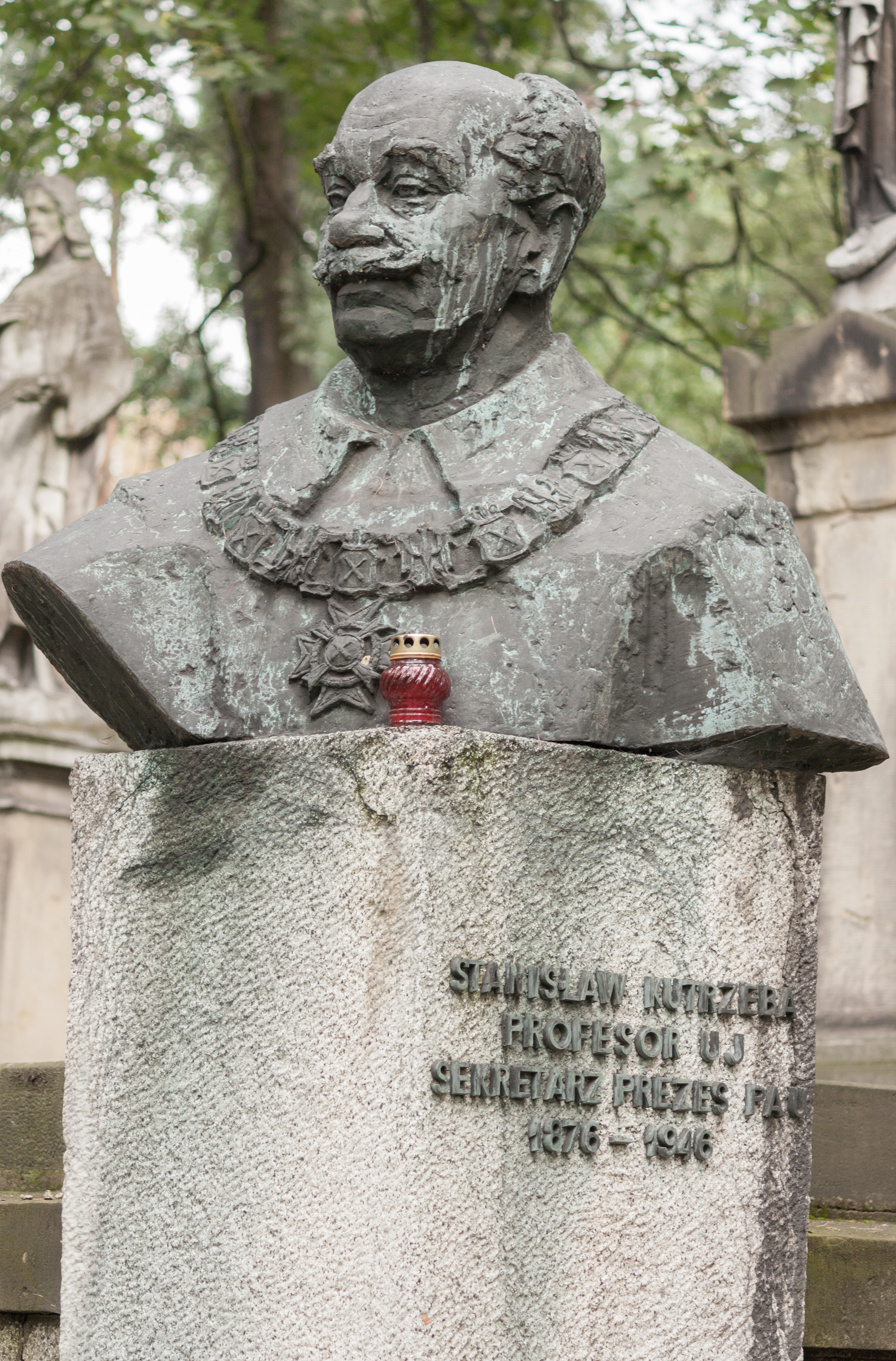
Bust of Stanisław Kutrzeba, Rakowicki Cemetery, Kraków

Stanisław Kutrzeba spent his youth in Kraków, where he finished his education, obtaining a doctorate in law from the Jagiellonian University in 1898; he also studied abroad (in Paris) and in 1902 he obtained a habilitation. His career was closely connected to the university where he obtained his doctorate: he became a professor of the Jagiellonian University in 1908 and from then until the end of his life was the Chair of Studies in Polish law. Chair of the Law Department (1913/1914, 1920/1921), he also held the post of university's rector (1932/33).

He was also an activist in other organizations, the most prominent of which was the Polish Academy of Learning. He was its General Secretary (1926–39) and its president (1939–1946). Other organizations he was active in included: Warsaw Scientific Society, Lwów Scientific Society, Poznań Society of Friends of Arts and Sciences, Polish Historical Society and Kraków's Historical and Monument Society. He was a member of foreign and international organizations, such as the Hungarian Academy of Sciences and the French Académie des Sciences Morales et Politiques.

In November 1939 he was arrested by German Nazis during their purge of Kraków's Polish intellectuals (Sonderaktion Krakau). Until February 1940 he was a prisoner in the Sachsenhausen concentration camp. Upon release, he joined the Polish Underground State. He became a member of the Committee of Three, which aided persecuted families of persons related to the university; he was also active in underground education.

In 1918 he was a member of the Polish delegation at the Paris Peace Conference (1919–1920).

In 1944 he was involved in the talks that led to the creation of a Provisional Government of National Unity. In 1945 he became a member of the State National Council.

He received decorations including the Commander's Cross and Commander's Cross with Star of Polonia Restituta (1930) and the Officer's Cross of the Légion d'honneur.

== Works ==
Kutrzeba works in the area of history were centered on the history of Polish law, the history of Poland from the 14th to 18th centuries and the history of Kraków. He published over 400 various academic works. He was also involved in the publishing of the Polish Biographical Dictionary. His Historia źródeł dawnego prawa polskiego (1925–1926) was reviewed by his former student, another contemporary Polish historian of law and professor of Jagiellonian University, Adam Vetulani, as "the most important support work for historical sciences, created in the interwar period."

Selected works:

- Przyczynek do dyplomatyki polskiej w XIII wieku (1895)
- Finanse Krakowa w wiekach średnich (1899)
- Historya rodziny Wierzynków (1899)
- Podwody miast polskich do roku 1564 (1900)
- Stosunki prawne Żydów w Polsce w XV stuleciu (1901)
- Studya do historii sądownictwa w Polsce (1901–1903)
- Handel Krakowa w wiekach średnich na tle stosunków handlowych Polski (1902)
- Taryfy celne i polityka celna w Polsce od XIII do XV wieku (1902)
- Urzędy koronne i nadworne w Polsce, ich początki i rozwój do roku 1504 (1903)
- Dawny zarząd Wawelu (1906)
- Skład sejmu polskiego, 1493-1793 (1906)
- Mężobójstwo w prawie polskiem XIV i XV wieku (1907)
- Franciszek Piekosiński jako historyk prawa polskiego (1908)
- Przyczynki do teoryi runicznej (1909)
- Kilka słów o metrykach kościelnych w Polsce (1910)
- Unia Polski z Litwą. Problem i metoda badania (1911)
- Sprawa polska w Królestwie Polskim 1815-1915 (1916)
- Sprawa żydowska w Polsce (1918)
- Dawne polskie prawo sądowe (1921, 2 tomy)
- Polska Odrodzona (1921)
- Sejm Walny dawnej Rzeczypospolitej Polskiej (1922)
- Polskie prawo polityczne według traktatów (1923, 2 części)
- Historia Śląska (1933, redaktor)
- Metoda historyczna w prawie politycznym (1938)
- Polska Akademia Umiejętności 1872-1938 (1939)
- Wstęp do nauki o państwie i prawie (1946)

== See also ==
- List of Poles
