= Angelo Rossi (Italian politician) =

Italian politician (born 1976)

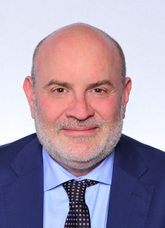
- Rossi in 2022

Member of the Chamber of Deputies
- Incumbent
- Assumed office 13 October 2022
- Constituency: Lazio 1 – 03

Personal details
- Born: 23 February 1976 (age 50)
- Party: Brothers of Italy

Angelo Rossi (born 23 February 1976) is an Italian politician serving as a member of the Chamber of Deputies since 2022. He has served as treasurer of the parliamentary group of Brothers of Italy since 2022.
