= Grażyna Małgorzata Vetulani =

Polish philologist (born 1956)

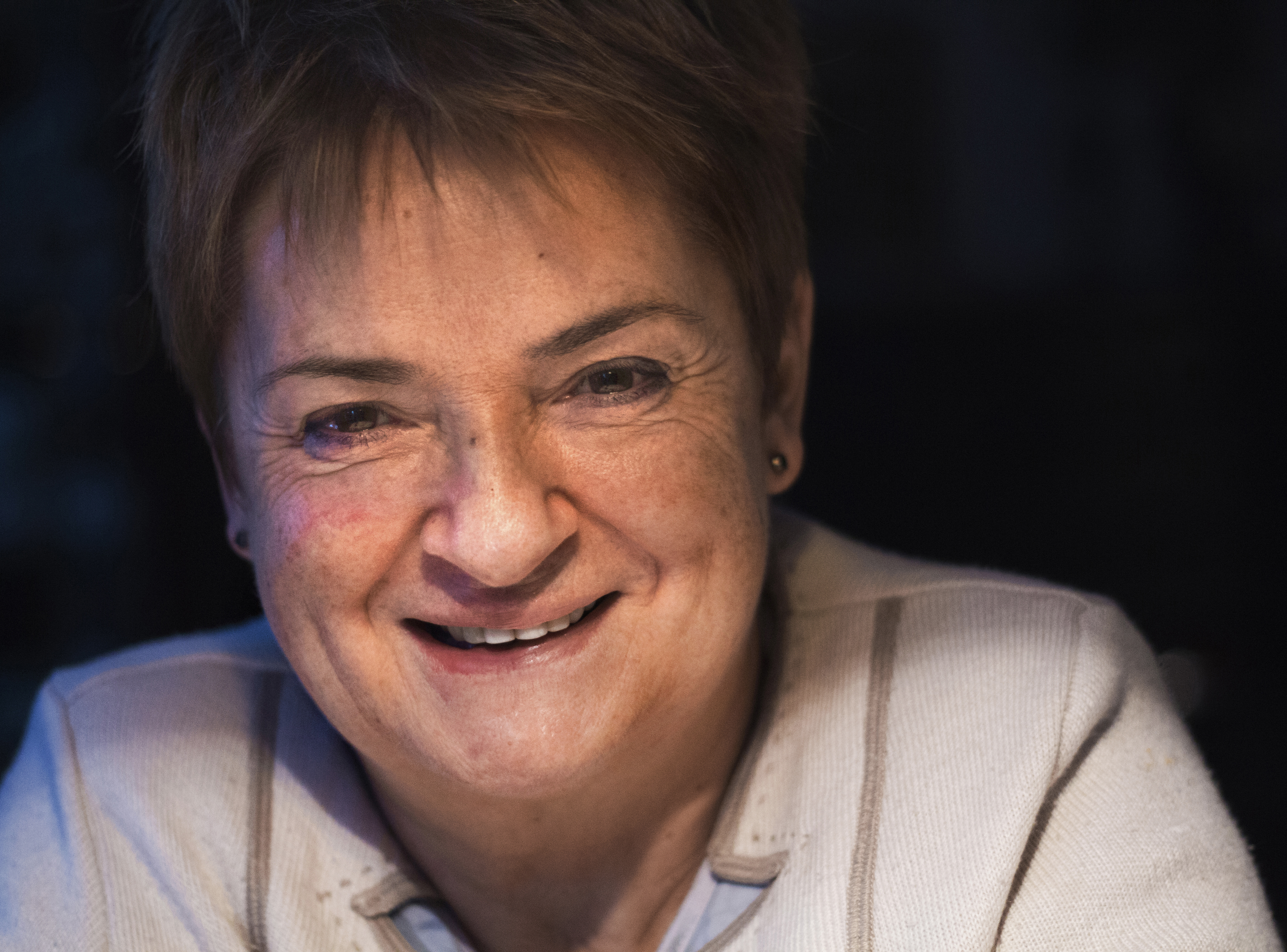
- Małgorzata Vetulani in 2019
- Born: Grażyna Świerczyńska; 15 March 1956 (age 70); Bydgoszcz
- Citizenship: Polish
- Occupations: philologist linguist
- Spouse: Zygmunt Vetulani
- Children: Agnieszka, Maria

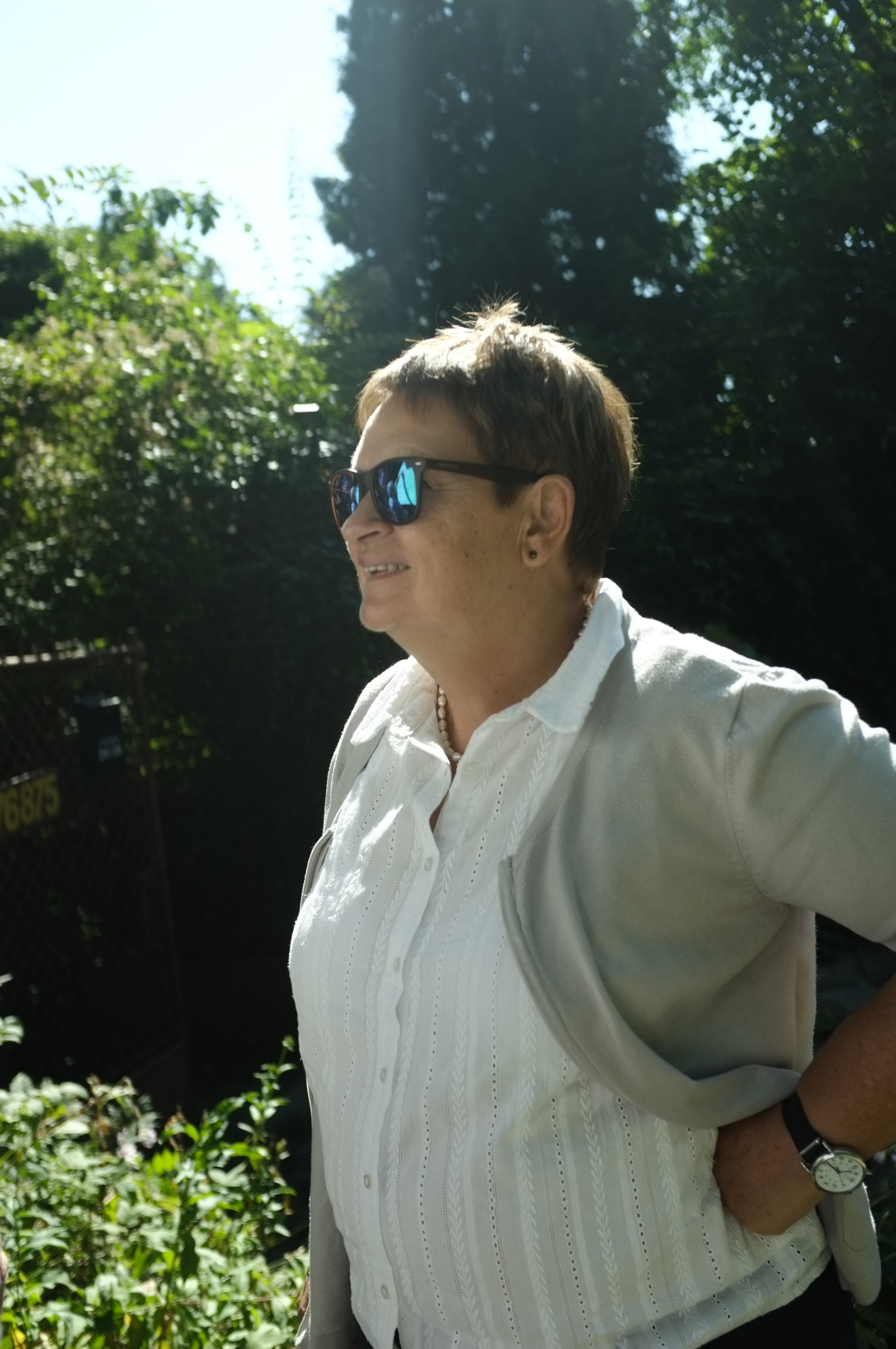
Małgorzata Vetulani, 2021

Grażyna Małgorzata Vetulani née Świerczyńska (born 15 March 1956) is a Polish philologist and linguist, professor of the humanities, professor at the Adam Mickiewicz University in Poznań and the Nicolaus Copernicus University in Toruń.

== Biography ==
She is a daughter of Hieronim Świerczyński and Regina Kocińska. In 1979 she graduated in Romance studies from Adam Mickiewicz University. She received a PhD in 1988. On 17 June 2013 she received the title of full professor.

Since 1979 Grażyna Vetulani works at the Adam Mickieiwcz University in Poznań. She is a Head of Department of Contrastive Linguistics since 2000. Since 2008 she is a member of the University Senate.

Vetulani is an author of a number of scientific publications (including three books) on general, contrastive and computer linguistics and semantics. She was an editor of four joint studies. She participated as a speaker in scientific conferences several times, including events in Prague, Ljubljana, Athens, Paris and Berlin.

She is a member of editorial board of magazines Echo des études romanes. Revue semestrielle de linguistique et de littérature romanes and Etudes romanes de Brno.

In 2012 she received a Gold Medal for Long Service.

Her husband Zygmunt Vetulani is a professor of technical sciences and lecturer at Adam Mickiewicz University. They have two daughters: Agnieszka (born 1981) and Maria (born 1996).

== Selected works ==
- Vetulani, G., Vetulani, Z., & Obrębski, T. (2006, May). Syntactic lexicon of polish predicative nouns. In Proceedings of the Fifth International Conference on Language Resources and Evaluation (LREC’06).
- Vetulani, G. (2012). Kolokacje werbo-nominalne jako samodzielne jednostki języka. Wydawnictwo Naukowe Uniwersytetu im. Adama Mickiewicza.
- Vetulani, G. (2013). Problemy i korzyści wynikające z automatycznego przetwarzania korpusów-na przykładzie badań z zakresu predykacji rzeczownikowej w języku polskim. Roczniki Humanistyczne, 61(08), 13–24.
- Vetulani, Z., Vetulani, G., & Kochanowski, B. (2016, May). Recent advances in development of a lexicon-grammar of Polish: PolNet 3.0. In Tenth International Conference on Language Resources and Evaluation (LREC 2016) (pp. 2851-2854).
- Vetulani, G. (2018). Próby formalizacji zdań opartych na predykatach rzeczownikowych języka polskiego.
