= Angelo Maria Rossi =

Painter from Italy

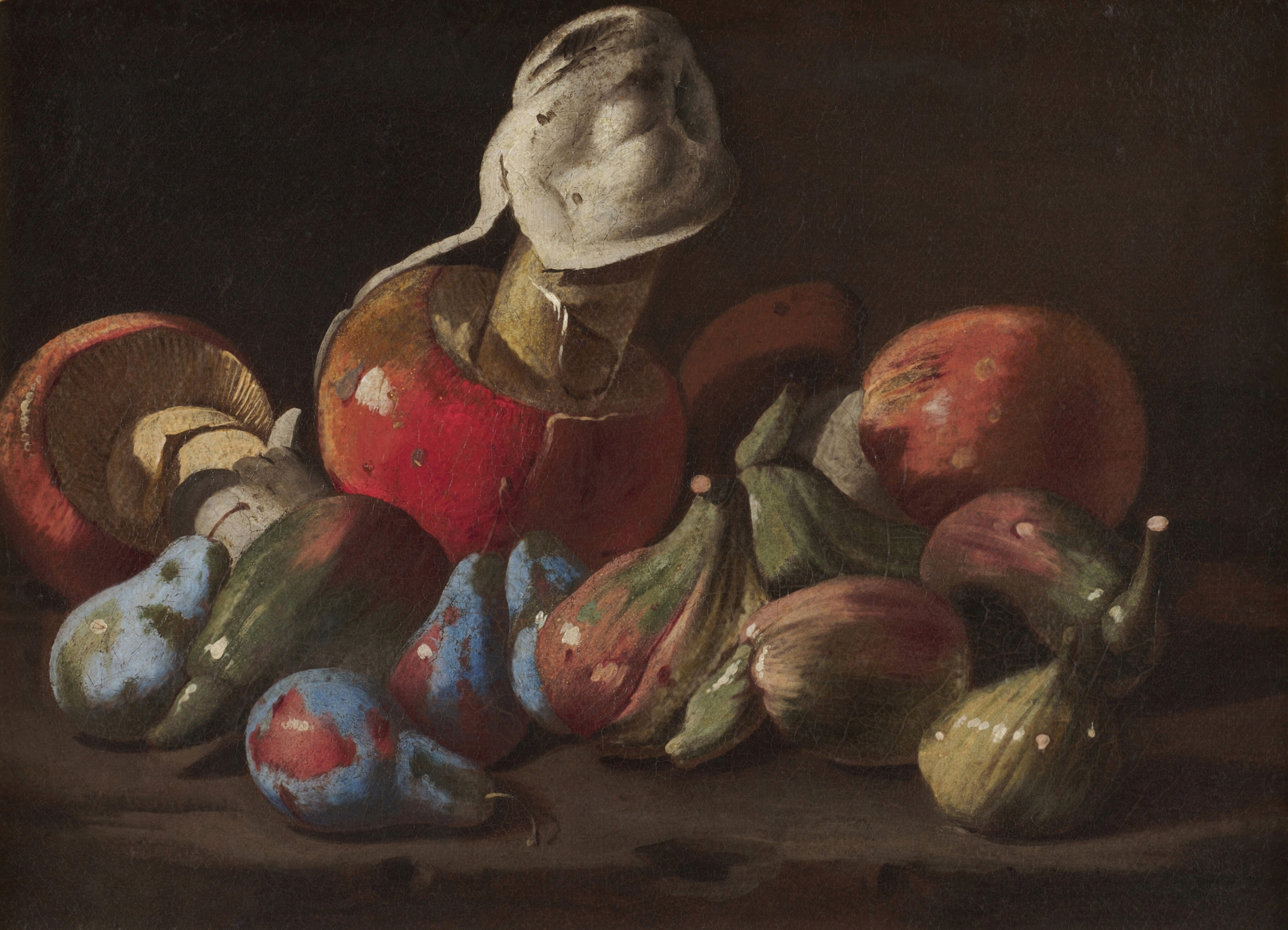
Fruit, vegetables and mushrooms on a rocky ledge

Angelo Maria Rossi (also Pseudo-Fardella, or Pittore di Carlo Torre) was an Italian painter active in Lombardy in the 17th century whose identity and activity were only recently rediscovered. His work was previously grouped under the notname 'Pseudo-Fardella', as his work shows stylistic similarities with those by the Sicilian painter Giacomo Fardella di Calvello. In 1996, another notname was coined for Rossi: the 'Pittore di Carlo Torre' (painter of Carlo Torre) because on one of his still lifes painted around 1662 he had included a dedication to the well-known Milanese writer Carlo Torre (circa 1620–79).

It was only in 2003 that Italian art historian Giuseppe Cirillo discovered the monogram 'A.M.R.' on various canvases ascribed to the artist and was therevy definitely able to connect the name Angelo Maria Rossi to this corpus. Rossi was active in the period between 1665 and 1701. His paintings were much in demand in his time and were represented in many collections in Milan and Turin.

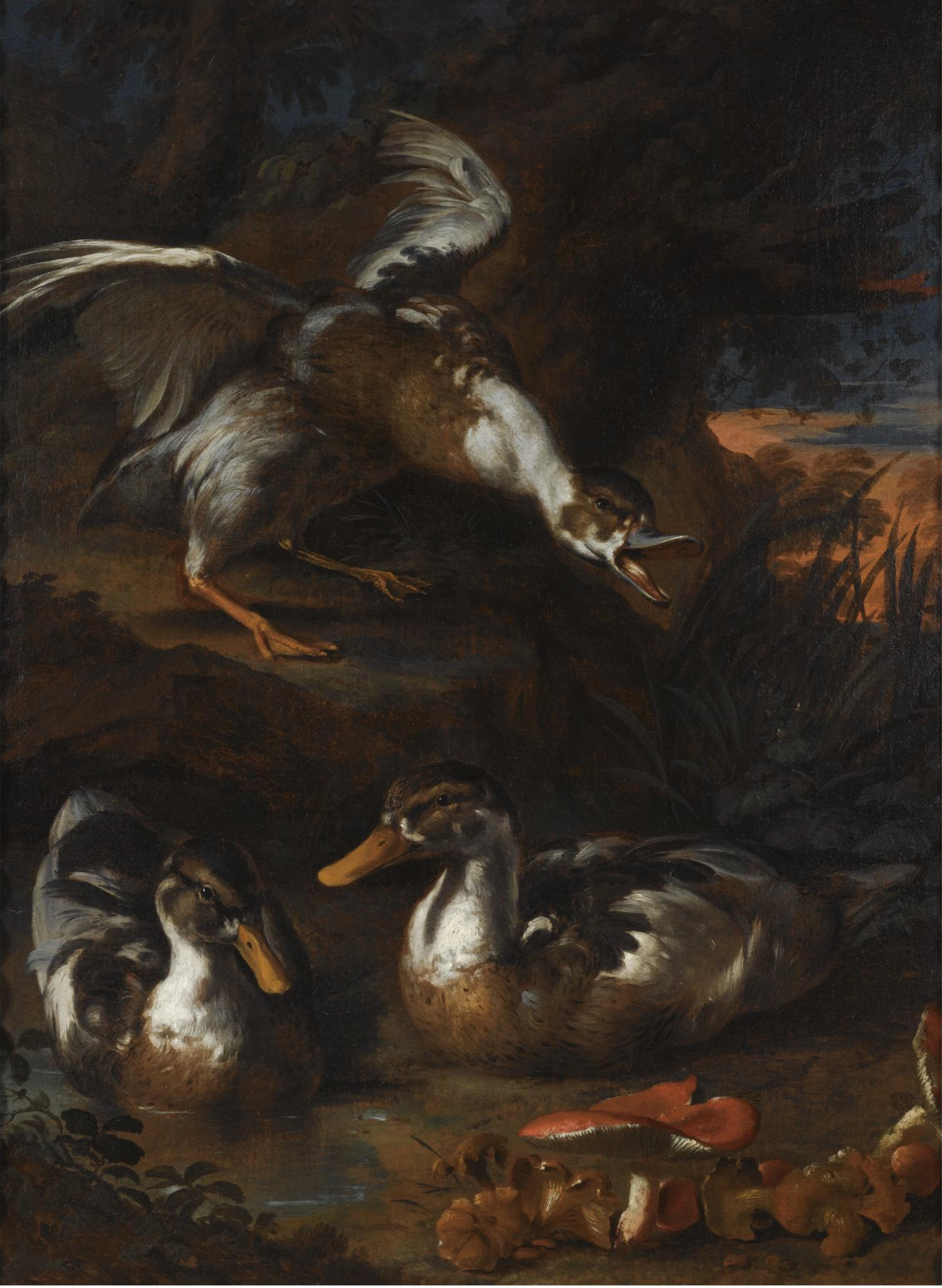
Three ducks in a wooded landscape, wild mushrooms in the foreground

His works are characterised by their technical mastery and the superb rendering of the various types of fruit. In their marked luminosity and chiaroscuro effects they show the influence of the still lifes of Caravaggio and his circle. The extreme and raw realism in the rendering of the individual elements in his compositions also draw on Caravaggio's still lifes.
