= Legnica University of Management =

Coordinates: 51°12′20″N 16°09′58″E

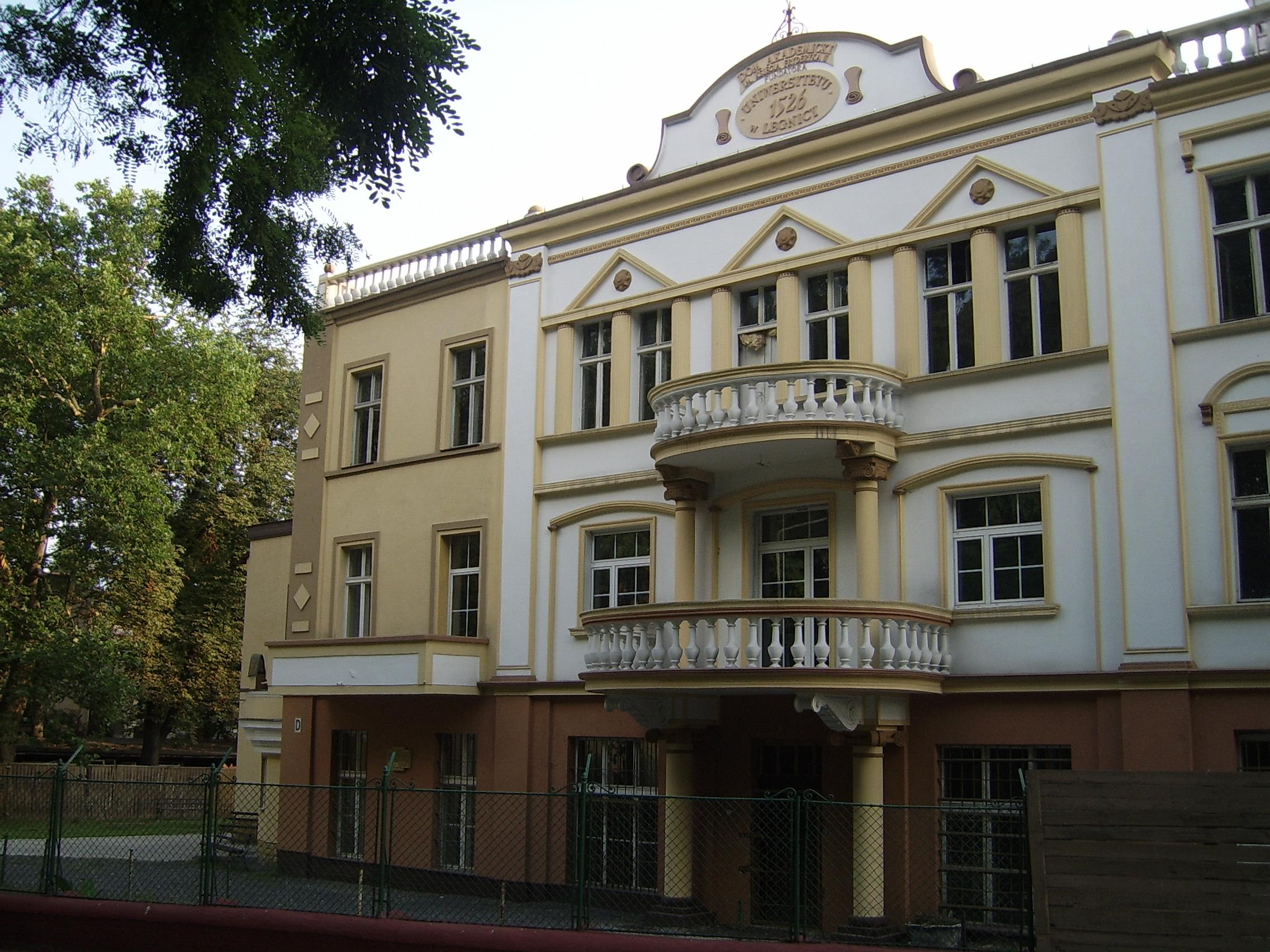
Legnica-WSM ul Korfantego

Legnica University of Management (Polish: "Wyższa Szkoła Menedżerska w Legnicy") is a university in Legnica, Poland, specialising in subjects related to management.

== History ==
The university was established in 1997, and has promoted over 1,600 graduates. The range of courses offered by the university has expanded since its establishment in 1997; the newest ones to open are Transport and Computer Science (2001) and Sociology and Architecture and City Planning (2004). Legnica University of Management is the largest higher education institution in the region. As of January 2016, the university has 1,927 students, including 568 post-graduate students and 1,135 undergraduates.

== Areas of study ==
Degrees offered at the university include undergraduate and post-graduate degrees, and can be studied full-time or part-time. Undergraduate courses run by the university include: Architecture and Town Planning; Computer Science; Economics; Management and Marketing; pedagogy; sociology; and transport. Post-graduate options include Management and Marketing, and Law. The University is waiting for ministry approval to offer a course in Philology, and has also applied to the Ministry of Education for permission to provide PhD courses in economics. There are plans to establish another new course in Management and Production Engineering.

The university employs specialists from within Poland and from abroad. At the moment there are 155 academics co-operating with Legnica University of Management - 16 professors, 22 habilitated doctors, and 67 doctors. The school owns its own buildings, equipped with computer and specialist laboratories and a library.

The recruitment process is based on secondary school leaving exam results and an interview, and in the case of Architecture and Town Planning, also on results of a drawing exams and knowledge of art and architecture.

== International partnerships ==
Legnica University of Management participates in many national and international activities and partnerships:

- The university is participating in a TEMPUS Master of Business Administration & Information Technology programme that is based on cooperation with eight partners from Ukraine, Germany, Spain, and France. The aim of the project is the preparation of teaching programmes to educate specialists (master's degree) in the area of organisation management.
- Another academic unit that is co-operating with Legnica University of Management is Lviv University. The co-operation is aimed at joint research, and exchange of students and tutors.
- Since 2002, the university has been in cooperation with the University of the Littoral Opal Coast (ULCO) in Dunkirk, France, consisting of exchange of tutors and students, united research efforts, documentation within the tuition process, joint learning programmes, management support, and library development. In June 2004 the first 33 Polish participants in courses of the Maitrise de Superieure de Techniques en Management de l'Enterprise programme graduated.
- The university is cooperating with the University of Pennsylvania in the area of multicultural theory of leadership with 61 academic units from around the world.
- Since 2001 Legnica University of Management has been cooperating with academic units in Ukraine. The long-term cooperation is aimed at student exchange, tutor exchange, small business development, organisation of science conferences and seminars, and joint applications for grants. The students of the Legnica University of Management, according to signed documents, were participating in the summer language courses of Ukrainian language.

To develop its international partnerships, Legnica University of Management plans to: introduce the European Credit Transfer and Accumulation System (ECTS); introduce language courses into non-language learning degrees; participate in European projects related to student and staff mobility, via the Erasmus programme and the establishment of an International Relations Office; promote open and distance learning as a new method of teaching.
