= List of law schools in Poland =

This is a list of law schools in Poland.

== Public ==
- Gdańsk University, Faculty of Law and Administration
- Adam Mickiewicz University in Poznań, Faculty of Law and Administration
- Jagiellonian University in Kraków, Faculty of Law and Administration
- Cardinal Stefan Wyszynski University in Warsaw, Faculty of Law
- University of Łódź, Faculty of Law and Administration
- Maria Curie-Skłodowska University in Lublin, Faculty of Law and Administration
- Nicolaus Copernicus University in Toruń, Faculty of Law and Administration
- University of Opole, Faculty of Law and Administration
- University of Rzeszów, Faculty of Law and Administration
- University of Szczecin, Faculty of Law and Administration
- University of Silesia in Katowice, Faculty of Law and Administration
- Białystok University, Faculty of Law
- University of Warmia and Mazury in Olsztyn, Faculty of Law and Administration
- University of Warsaw, Faculty of Law and Administration
- University of Wrocław, Faculty of Law, Administration and Economy

== Non-public ==
- Catholic University of Lublin
  - Faculty of Law, Canon Law, and Administration
  - Faculty of Legal and Economic Sciences in Tomaszów Lubelski
  - Faculty of Social Sciences in Stalowa Wola
- European School of Law and Administration in Warsaw, Faculty of Law, Administration, International Relations
- Andrzej Frycz Modrzewski Cracow College, Faculty of Law and Administration
- Private Higher School of Business and Administration in Warsaw, Faculty of Administration, Law, and Diplomacy
- Ryszard Lazarski University of Commerce and Law in Warsaw, Faculty of Law
- SWPS University of Social Sciences and Humanities, Faculty of Law
- Warsaw Management Academy of the Society of Economic Enterprises, Faculty of Law, Administration, and European Integration
- Academy of International Economic and Political Relations in Gdynia, Faculty of Law
- Leon Koźmiński Academy of Entrepreneurship and Management in Warsaw, Faculty of Law
- Higher School of Management and Law in Warsaw, Faculty of Law (Warsaw and Wrocław)
- Legnica University of Management, Faculty of Law
