= Bohdan de Nisau =

Polish socialist and communist activist (1896–1943)

Bohdan Jan de Nisau
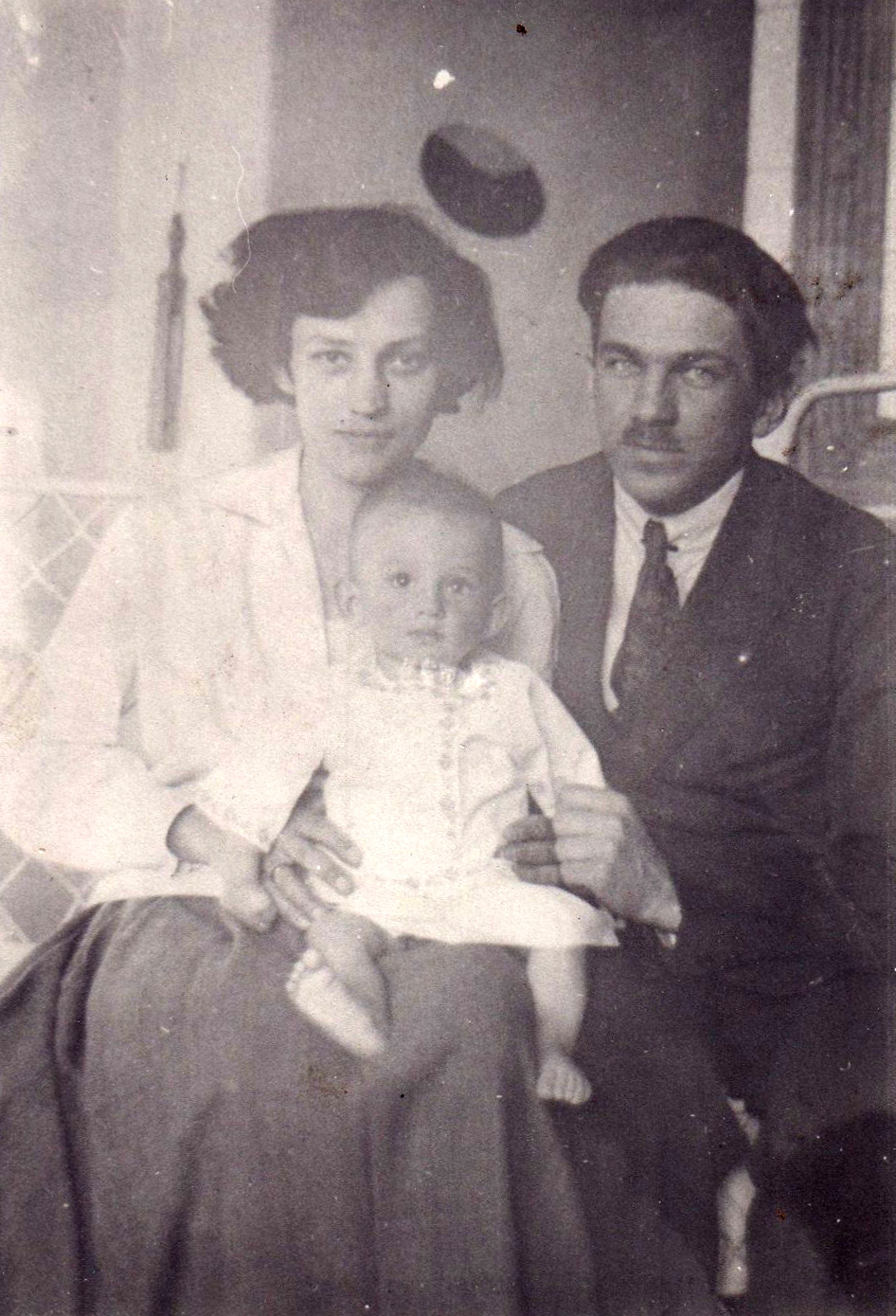
- Bohdan de Nisau (right) with his wife Maria and son Witold, 1924
- Born: 18 August 1896; Glinojeck
- Died: 26 January 1943 (aged 46); Voronezh
- Citizenship: Polish
- Occupations: chemical engineer, political activist

Bohdan Jan de Nisau (18 August 1896 − 26 January 1943) was a Polish socialist and communist activist, chemical engineer, participant in the Silesian Uprisings and prisoner of Stalin.

== Biography ==
He was the son of Feliks Józef, an official, and Wanda Izabela Mieczkowska. In 1914 he graduated from the Trade School in Mława and started chemical studies at the University of Warsaw, which he never completed. The same year he joined the Polish Socialist Party (PPS) and Polish Military Organisation in the district of Ciechanów. As a member of PMO he took part in disarming German soldiers in 1918, when Poland regained its independence.

In 1919 he joined Union of Independent Socialist Youth (ZNMS). After completing the plebiscite course he went to Upper Silesia to work on the plebiscite organization. He was an editor of The Workers Paper.

In August 1920 de Nisau took part in the Second Silesian Uprising and later was a member of the Wawelberg Group. He left PPS on 18 September 1920, after being accused of communist tendencies. In the Third Silesian Uprising (May – July 1921) he was a leader of a subdivision in the Wawelberg Group. His conspiratorial pseudonym was Zdzisław Zagozda.

He was a member of the executive committee of ZNMS since 1922 until the group's breakup in 1923. He co-organised the Independent Peasants' Party. In 1923 de Nisau joined the Communist Party of Poland.

That same year he married Maria Vetulani. Their son Witold was born in 1924. In 1927 Bohdan left for the Soviet Union. His family joined him soon after that, having left Poland on false documents.

In the Soviet Union he worked under the name Egon Bogdanowicz Sztern, at first in a chemical plant in Dzerzhinsk and from 1933 as a head of chemical laboratory in Horlivka. He was arrested in 1934, in the time of Great Purge, and was accused of Trotskyism. His wife fled back to Poland with their little son, convinced of her husband's death. In fact Bohdan died in prison in Voronezh only in 1943.
