= Charles Belfoure =

American architect and novelist (born 1954)

- Born: February 19, 1954 (age 72); Baltimore, Maryland, U.S.
- Education: Pratt Institute; Columbia University
- Occupations: Writer; architect; historian
- Writing career
- Period: 1997–present
- Genres: history, historical fiction
- Website: Official website

Charles Belfoure (born February 19, 1954) is an American writer, architect and historian specializing in historic preservation, author of several histories and fiction works, including The Paris Architect.

== Biography ==
Charles Belfoute was born in 1954. His father, Charles William Belfoure, was a second class yeoman of the U.S. Navy, who was in service during World War II, Korean and Vietnam War. His mother was Polish immigrant Kristine Vetulani, a translator, teacher and a survivor of Nazi labor camps. He grew up in Woodlawn, the suburbs of Baltimore, Maryland, and attended the Woodlawn High School. In 1983 he graduated from the Pratt Institute with a Bachelor in Architecture and in 1993 from the Columbia University with a Master of Science in Real Estate Development.

He is a specialist in historic preservation. He taught at Pratt Institute and at the Goucher College in Baltimore, and has been a freelance contributor to The New York Times and The Baltimore Sun. He published several architectural histories and was a recipient of a Graham Foundation national grant for architectural research.

At one point of his career, he began to write novels. The Paris Architect, Belfoure's first novel, was published by Sourcebooks Landmark on October 8, 2013, in the U.S. Following the story of a French architect Lucien Bernard, being paid to create temporary hiding places for Jews in Nazi-occupied Paris, the book received generally positive reviews. Malcolm Gladwell of The Guardian chose The Paris Architect his favourite book of 2013, calling it "a beautiful and elegant account of an ordinary man's unexpected and reluctant descent into heroism during the second world war". Belfoure's debut in fiction was found among finalists of the 2015 International Dublin Literary Award and hit The New York Times best seller list in an e-book category in July 2015. The book has been translated into at least ten languages. StudioCanal and The Picture Company acquired the rights to film The Paris Architect. Chris Salmanpour was signed up to adapt the script.

Belfoure's second novel, House of Thieves, was published on September 15, 2015. Set in 1886 in New York, it tells the story of an architect forced to join a criminal gang, and therefore plan robberies of the buildings he had previously designed to pay off his son's debts. Publishers Weekly praised the work, pointing out that "Belfoure holds together each and every thread of the novel, resulting in a most memorable, evocative read". Jocelyn McClurg of USA Today gave the book three out of four stars, saying that "channeling Dickens, Belfoure designs a rollicking story but overloads on improbabilities. No matter – it's a blueprint for great fun". House of Thieves was said to be adapted for television by the Mark Gordon Company, with Francis Lawrence to direct the series.

Belfoure's third novel, The Fallen Architect, was released on October 9, 2018. Set in 1905, it tells the story of a British architect in the Edwardian era. Publishers Weekly reviewer called it an "exceptional mystery" and said that "Belfoure offers the reader glimpses of early motion pictures, variety hall jokes that are still funny, and a description of Edward VII consuming a 10-course meal. This wonderfully realized background coupled with insights into British society make this a standout", yet Kirkus Reviews contributor pointed out that several "structural failures loom" in the course of the plot, and one of the plot twists "is a cul de sac from which Belfoure, himself an architect, cannot design a convincing exit. The music hall décor and atmosphere help distract from the flawed whodunit". The Fallen Architect was announced a 2019 Nero Award Finalist.

In 2018, Belfoure announced that he has been working on his fourth novel. The Fabergé Secret, released by Severn House of London on January 5, 2021, in the U.K. and the U.S., takes place on the court of Nicholas II of Russia. It is about a prince whose life is changed after witnessing the 1903 Easter Sunday pogrom in Kishinev. Spanish translation of The Fabergé Secret was published in Mexico and Chile. Belfoure's fifth novel, Monsters with Human Faces, was released in 2022 by Flying Buttress Publishing with sales carried out exclusively on Amazon.

Belfoure uses his architectural background to develop the plot of his novels. He said that he never took creative writing lessons and that he "hesitated writing fiction", but discovered that John Grisham, who was also never trained in writing, has been using his legal background for his fiction works. Belfoure decided to use his knowledge in the field of architecture in a similar way. When asked about the works that influenced him most, he pointed to Robert Caro's The Power Broker, William Golding's Lord of the Flies and novels by Thomas Hardy, especially Jude the Obscure and The Mayor of Casterbridge.

Belfoure lives in Westminster, Maryland. His son Christopher Belfoure graduated in history from West Virginia University in 2010, and died due to a fatal ATV accident the following year. A memorial scholarship – The Christopher Belfoure Chinese Studies Travel Abroad Fund – was established to honor his memory. Belfoure also has a daughter, Julie.

== Works ==
=== Novels ===
- The Paris Architect (2013)
- House of Thieves (2015)
- The Fallen Architect (2018)
- The Fabergé Secret (2021)
- Monsters with Human Faces (2022)

=== Monographs ===
- The Baltimore Rowhouse (with Mary Ellen Hayward, 1997)
- Monuments to Money: The Architecture of American Banks (2005)
- Edmund G. Lind: Anglo-American Architect of Baltimore and the South (2009)
- Rebuilding Baltimore. The Azola Legacy – 50 Years (with Martin P. Azola, 2018)

== Awards ==
- Finalist of the International Dublin Literary Award for The Paris Architect (2015)
- Finalist of the Nero Award for The Fallen Architect (2019)
- Preservation Award, awarded by the Baltimore Heritage for the restoration and rehabilitation of the Marburg House, 6 E. Eager Street, Baltimore (2019)
