= Social cooperative =

Cooperative that provides social services

Social cooperatives exist to provide social services such as the care of children, elderly and disabled people, and the integration of unemployed people into the workforce. The phenomenon is most developed in Italy, but exists in various forms in many countries. In countries such as Sweden and Britain they exist without any special legislation, while elements of the Italian model have been legislated for in Belgium (société à finalité sociale / venootschap met sociaal oogmerk) and Poland.

An Italian social cooperative is a particularly successful form of multi-stakeholder cooperative, of which over 14,000 exist. A "type A" social cooperative brings together providers and beneficiaries of a social service as members. A "type B" social cooperative brings together permanent workers and previously unemployed people who wish to integrate into the labour market.

Social co-operatives are legally defined as follows:

- the objective is the general benefit of the community and the social integration of citizens
- type A co-operatives provide health, social or educational services
- those of type B integrate disadvantaged people into the labour market. The categories of disadvantage they target may include physical and mental disability, drug and alcohol addiction, developmental disorders and problems with the law. They do not include other factors of disadvantage such as race, sexual orientation or abuse
- various categories of stakeholder may become members, including paid employees, beneficiaries, volunteers (up to 50% of members), financial investors and public institutions. In type B co-operatives at least 30% of the members must be from the disadvantaged target groups
- the co-operative has legal personality and limited liability
- voting is one person, one vote
- no more than 80% of profits may be distributed, interest is limited to the bond rate and dissolution is altruistic (assets may not be distributed)

== See also ==
- Multistakeholder Model
