= Vetulani =

Vetulani is a surname of a Polish family of Italian origin, Vetulani family; see the latter article for the origin and meaning of the surname. Notable people with the surname include:

- Adam Vetulani (1901–1976), legal historian
- Agnieszka Vetulani-Cęgiel (born 1981), political scientist
- Armand Vetulani (1909–1994), art historian
- Cecylia Vetulani (1908–1980), art historian and conservator
- Franciszek Vetulani (1856–1921), engineer and official
- Grażyna Vetulani (born 1956), philologist and linguist
- Irena Latinik-Vetulani (1904–1975), biologist
- Jerzy Vetulani (1936–2017), neuroscientist and pharmacologist
- Kazimierz Vetulani (1889–1941), engineer and construction theorist
- Kristine Vetulani-Belfoure (1924–2004), teacher, translator and writer
- Maria Vetulani de Nisau (1898–1944), combatant for Poland's independence
- Roman Vetulani (1849–1908), high school professor
- Tadeusz Vetulani (1897–1952), biologist and zootechnician
- Tomasz Vetulani (born 1965), painter and sculptor
- Zofia Vetulani (1893–1981), civil servant, social and political activist
- Zygmunt Vetulani (diplomat) (1894–1942), diplomat and economist
- Zygmunt Vetulani (computer scientist) (born 1950), mathematician and computer scientist

== See also ==
- Giampaolo Vettolani – a distant relative
