= Maria Vetulani de Nisau =

Polish resistance member (1898–1944)

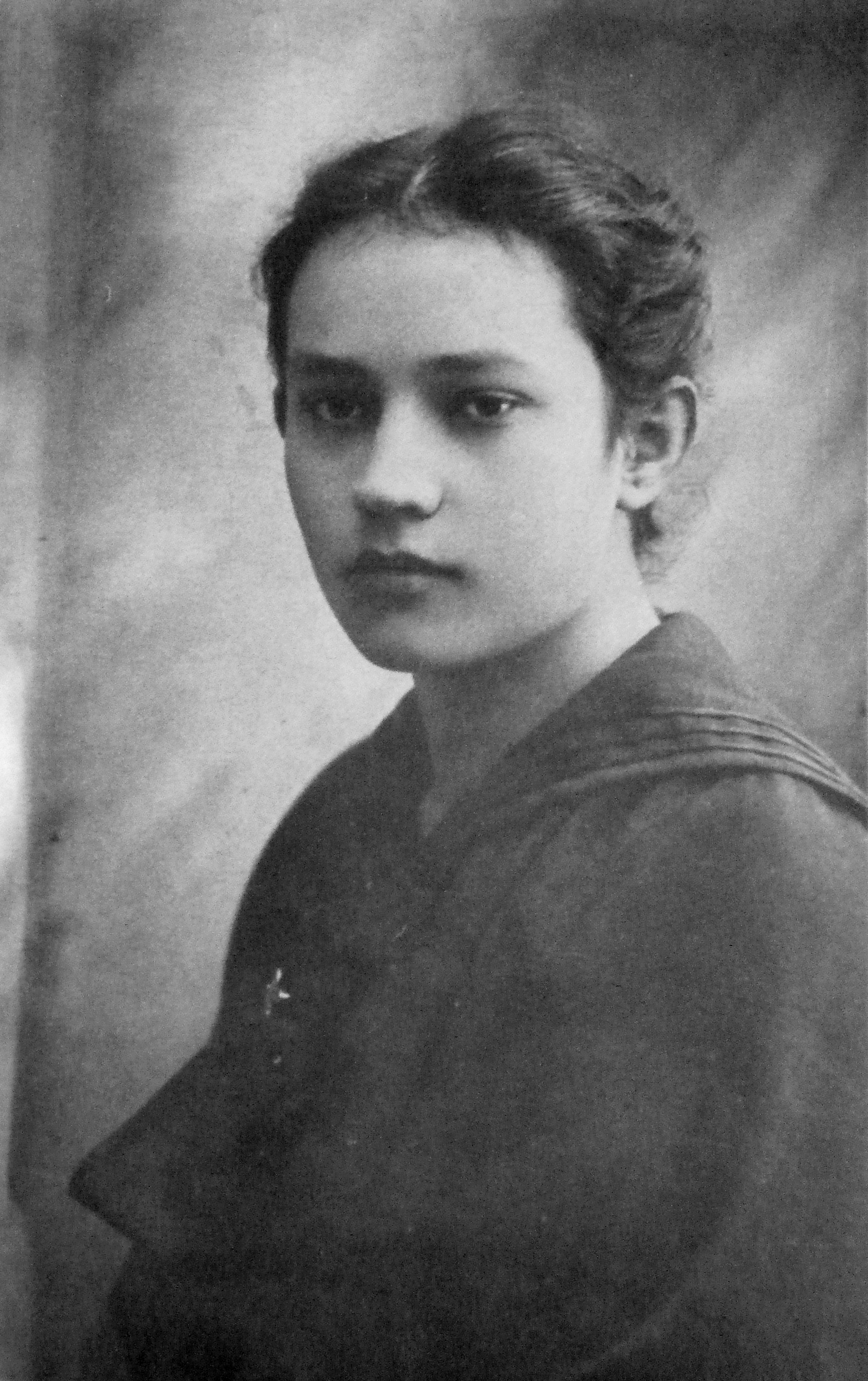
- Born: 27 November 1898; Tarnów
- Died: 2 September 1944 (aged 45); Warszawa

Maria de Nisau née Vetulani (27 November 1898 – 2 September 1944) was a Polish woman soldier, combatant for Poland's independence, and participant in the Polish-Ukrainian War and World War II. She was killed by the Germans during a massacre of the Warsaw Uprising hospitals, where she was being treated for injury she sustained as a member of the Polish resistance (Home Army).

== Biography ==
She was the daughter of an engineer, Franciszek Vetulani (1856−1921), and Katarzyna Ipohorska-Lenkiewicz (1868−1915). She had a brother, Stanisław, and two sisters, Zofia and Cecylia. Her family lived in numerous cities, first in Tarnów, later in Kraków, Lwów, Zakopane, and back in Tarnów. After graduating from Orzeszkowa Gimnazjum in Tarnów, where Maria was a scouts member, in 1918 she began medical studies at Jagiellonian University. She was a member of the Polish Military Organisation. In 1918–1919 she fought in the defense of Lwów, wearing as a camouflage a man's uniform as woman were not allowed to take part in regular fights. She claimed to be a Jagiellonian University student, Marian Ipohorski.

In 1923 she married communist activist Bohdan de Nisau. In 1924 their son Witold was born and Vetulani decided not to continue her studies at the university. In 1925 Maria and her family settled down in Warsaw, but after two years they moved to the Soviet Union. In 1934 Bohdan was arrested by the Soviets so she fled the USSR, believing her husband had been killed (after the war it was said that Bohdan de Nisau was killed in the Soviet prison almost ten years later, in 1943). She returned to Warsaw, where she worked as an office worker.

During the occupation she was a liaison soldier of the Home Army. Her conspiratorial pseudonym was Maryna. In her apartment at Świętokrzyska Street she organised a contact point and a hiding place for Jewish people. In August 1944 she took part in the Warsaw Uprising. During the fights Vetulani was wounded. She was treated in the hospital at Długa Street and was killed on September 2, during the German pacification of the hospitals in Warsaw. Her son Witold also fought in the Uprising; he was wounded and imprisoned by the Nazis, but survived.

Maria Vetulani was twice awarded with the Cross of Valor. A street in Tarnów is named after her.

Vetulani family

* the list is incomplete

Michał Vetulani	Franciszka (née Śliwińska)
Jan	Matylda (née Pisz)	Roman	Elżbieta (née Kunachowicz)	Franciszek; Latinik	Franciszek	Katarzyna (née Ipohorska)
Eugeniusz	Kazimierz	Zygmunt	Tadeusz	Maria (née Godlewska)	Adam	Irena (née Latinik)	Zofia	Bohdan de Nisau	Maria	Cecylia
Armand	Wanda	Zygmunt	Grażyna (née Świerczyńska)	Krystyna	Jerzy	Maria (née Pająk)	Witold
Agnieszka	Maria	Charles	Tomasz
