= Zygmunt Vetulani =

Zygmunt Vetulani may refer to:

- Zygmunt Vetulani (diplomat) (1894–1942), diplomat and economist
- Zygmunt Vetulani (computer scientist) (born 1950), mathematician and computer scientist
