= Kazimierz Vetulani =

Polish civil engineer (1889–1941)

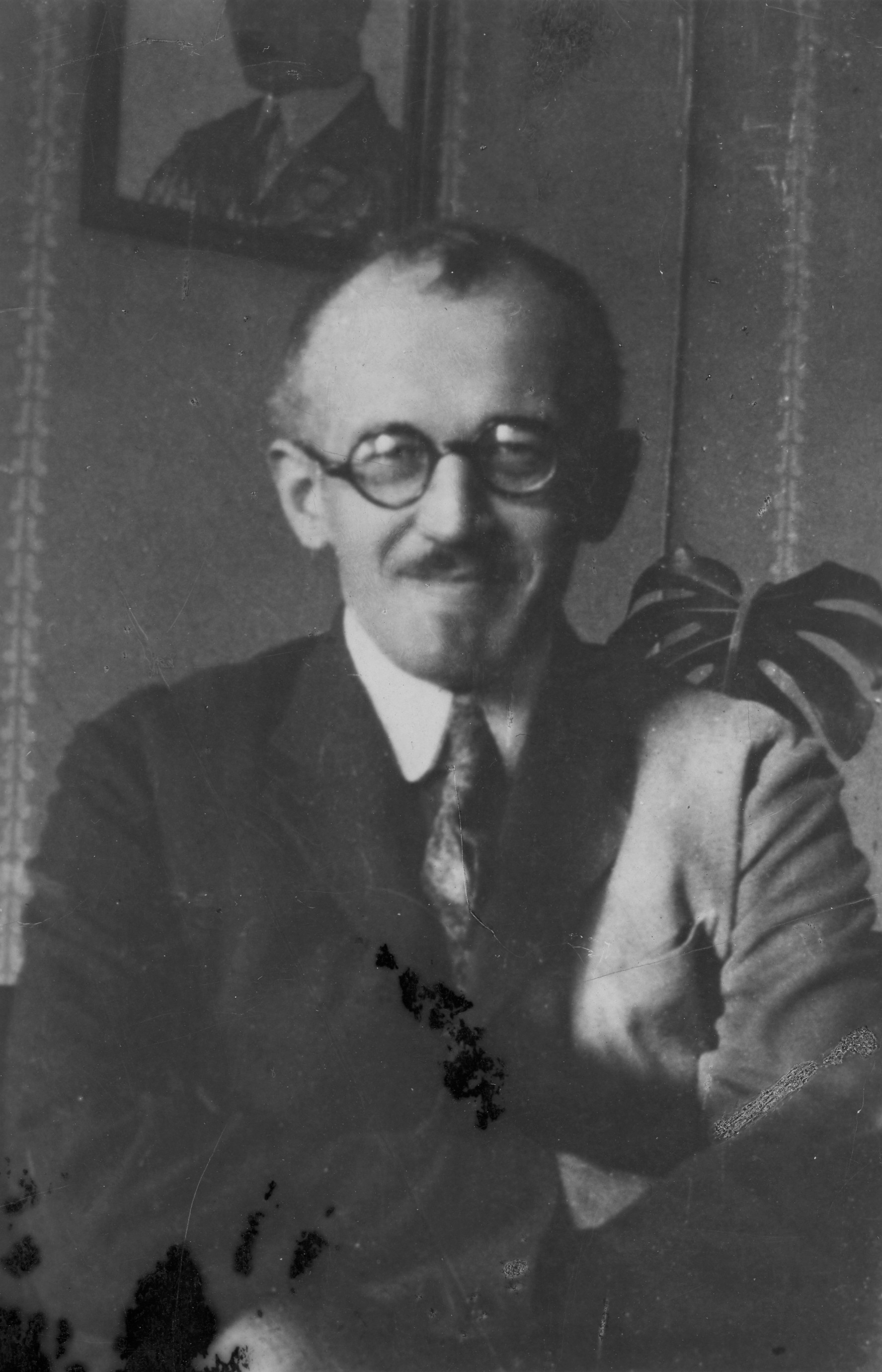
- Born: 3 January 1889; Sanok, Galicia, Austria-Hungary
- Died: 4 July 1941 (aged 52); Lviv, German-occupied Poland
- Citizenship: Austro-Hungarian, Polish
- Education: Lviv Polytechnic (Master's degree, 1935) (Ph.D., 1935)
- Scientific career
- Fields: Civil engineering, Architectural engineering, Military engineering
- Institutions: Lviv Polytechnic
- Thesis: (1935)
- Doctoral advisor: Wojciech Rubinowicz

Kazimierz Franciszek Vetulani (3 January 1889 – 4 July 1941) was a Polish civil engineer, professor at the Lviv Polytechnic, member of the Polish Mathematical Society, author of several dozen papers in the fields of technology and mathematics, as well as in the field of musical scale theory.

A participant of World War I in the rank of lieutenant of the Austro-Hungarian Army reserve, he was a sapper and a military engineer. He was promoted to the rank of captain in the Polish Army reserve and participated in the Polish–Ukrainian War. In 1935 he obtained Ph.D. at the Lviv Polytechnic. In 1938 he was appointed a deputy professor of general mechanics, and in 1940 he was appointed full professor.

Shortly after the Germans seized Lviv during World War II, on the night of 4 July 1941, he was arrested by Gestapo, the German secret police, and murdered among a group of Lviv professors.

== Biography ==
=== Early life and education ===
He was born on 3 January 1889 in Sanok, (Note: Some sources incorrectly indicate the date of birth 2 January 1889.) then within the Kingdom of Galicia and Lodomeria; the son of Roman Vetulani, a high school professor, and Matylda née Pisz (1861–1891). His mother died on 15 December 1891, when Kazimierz Vetulani was less than three years old.

He was raised by his father and his second wife, Elżbieta née Kunachowicz. He had five younger, half-siblings: brothers Zygmunt (1894–1942), Tadeusz (1897–1952) and Adam (1901–1976), and sisters Maria (master of economics, clerk of the Agricultural Bank in Kraków, 1895–1945) and Elżbieta (1903–1921, died of tuberculosis).

The family lived in Sanok, in the house at Floriańska Street (later renamed Ignacy Daszyński Street) and in the villa of the Zaleski family at Świętego Jana Square. In 1906, Roman Vetulani died of a heart attack, chanting six children, including the then-seventeen-year-old Kazimierz. The mother, Elżbieta Vetulani, received a pension from her deceased husband, yet she remained the only breadwinner and faced material difficulties.

In 1907, Kazimierz Vetulani passed the matriculation examination with distinction at the Queen Sophia High School in Sanok. On the matriculation certificate of 15 June 1907, he had an excellent degree in mathematics and Polish language with a notion of a particular passion for those subjects.

In the years 1907–1913 he studied civil engineering at the Lviv Polytechnic, but he did not obtain a diploma. During the studies, he earned his living by giving tutoring and writing theses. He also made scientific and technical travels to Italy, Austria, the Czech Republic and Germany, where he visited the construction sites of large partitions of valleys, large bridges, boulevards and river regulations.

=== Military service and stay in Kraków ===
In the first half of 1914 he lectured on explosives engineering, including blowing up bridges and railroads, at the officer training courses of the Polish Rifle Squads in Vienna.

During World War I he was called to serve in the Austro-Hungarian Army and infantry reserve. He was promoted to the rank of second lieutenant on 1 September 1915, and then to the rank of lieutenant on 1 November 1917. (Note: In military records of Austro-Hungarian Army he was referred to in German as “Kasimir Vetulani”.) Around 1916–1918 he was assigned to the Imperial-Royal railway regiment. In the 1917/1918 academic year, he studied again at the Lviv Polytechnic.

As the war ended and Poland regained independence, he was admitted to the Polish Army as a lieutenant. In 1918 he built armoured trains in Nowy Sącz and Przemyśl and traveled to the besieged Lviv. He was promoted to the rank of captain in the corps of railway officers on 1 June 1919.

After completing his military service, he settled in Kraków and started work in a construction company. After the Peace of Riga of March 1921, he lectured at the Technical College of Railway Forces (Note: Polish: Wyższa Szkoła Techniczna Wojsk Kolejowych.) and at the courses of professional and reserve officers in Kraków.

He made contact with professors of the Jagiellonian University. In the years 1924–1939 he was a member of the Polish Mathematical Society. Thanks to the kindness of Kraków's mathematicians, he could use the collections of the Mathematical Institute. In the documents of the Polish Mathematical Society, the following address of Vetulani was noted (until 1938): Kraków, Smoleńsk Street 14.

In the 1921/1922 academic year, Kazimierz Vetulani was employed as an assistant at the Mining Academy in Kraków, where he lectured in strength of materials. Then he worked as a technical advisor to a number of large companies, enterprises and central and local government institutions as well as private clients.

In 1923 he was assigned as a reserve officer in the 1st Railway Regiment of the Polish Army. (Note: Polish: 1 Pułk Kolejowy Wojska Polskiego.) In 1924 he was verified on the list of railway sapper officers in the rank of captain and assigned as a reserve officer to the 1st Railway Sapper Regiment. (Note: Polish: 1 Pułk Saperów Kolejowych Wojska Polskiego.) In 1934, as a reserve captain of the engineering corps and sappers, he was included in a group of militia officers. He was assigned to the District Officers' Staff No. V and was then on the records of the Poviat Supplementary Command of the City of Kraków. (Note: Polish: Powiatowa Komenda Uzupełnień Kraków Miasto.)

=== Work at the Lviv Polytechnic ===
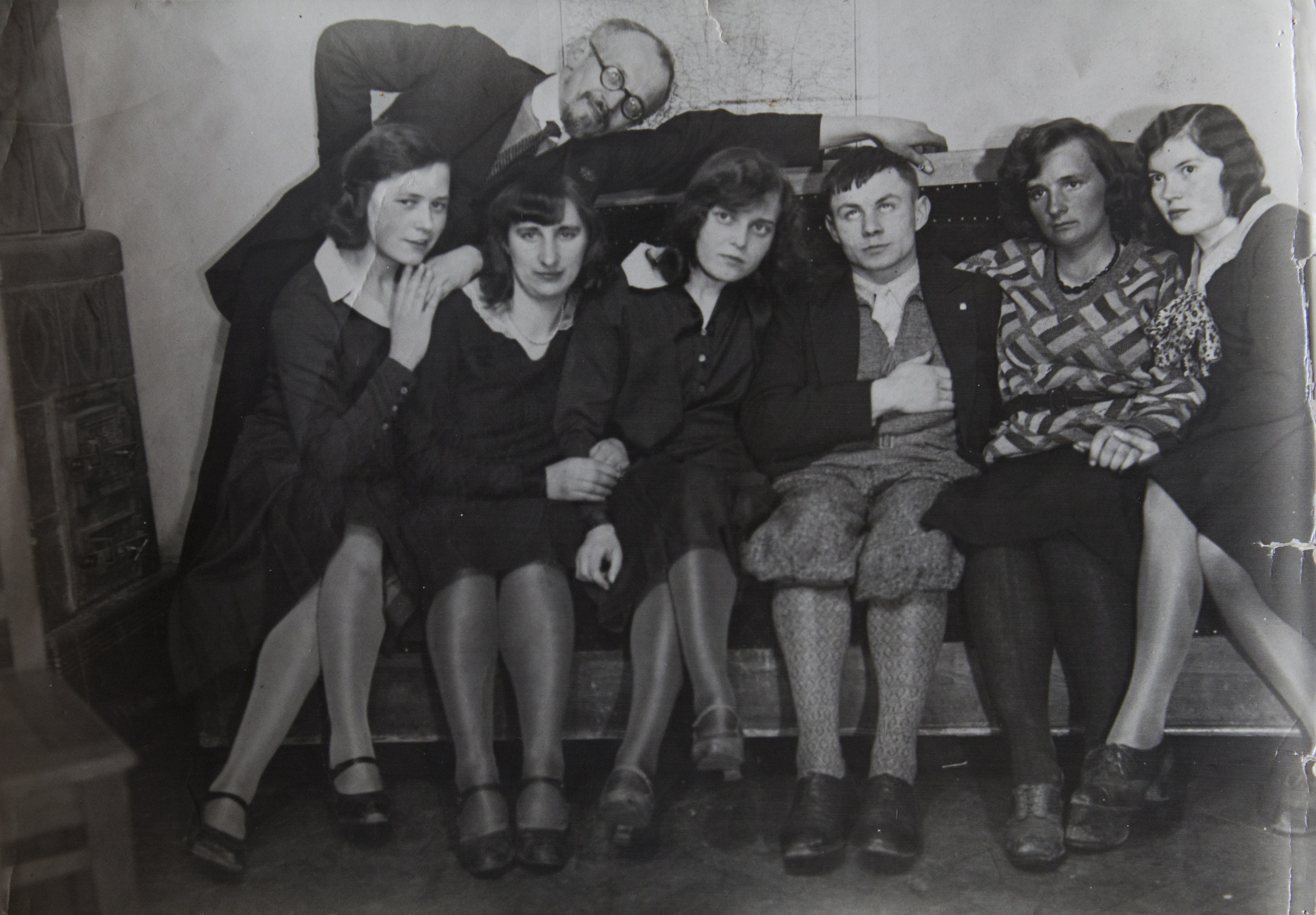
Kazimierz Vetulani (stands leaning against the sofa frame) at the party with his cousin Armand Vetulani (sits third from the right) in Milanówek, 1930s

Throughout 1920s and 1930s, Kazimierz Vetulani published a number of scientific papers. He actively participated in the scientific life, presenting the results of his research, among others, at the Second Congress of Romanian Mathematicians in Turnu-Severin on 5–9 May 1932.

He obtained the academic degree of road and bridge engineer at the Faculty of Civil and Water Engineering of the Lviv Polytechnic in April 1935. In the same year, he obtained Ph.D. in technical sciences at the Lviv Polytechnic (Note: The doctorate was awarded to him on 25 January 1936.) upon the dissertation On jets of liquid, supervised by Wojciech Rubinowicz. As “Kazimierz [Vetulani] was eccentric and did not want to take the doctoral exam in front of people dumber than himself, as the anecdote says, three professors took him for a walk in the park and the result of this conversation was considered to be a passed doctoral exam”.

In Lviv, Kazimierz Vetulani lived by himself at the 31 Obertyńska Street (nowadays Zarytsky Street), on the second floor.

In 1937 he received a scholarship from the National Culture Fund and took a scientific trip to Germany, Belgium, England and France, “where he became acquainted with the modern organization of mechanics teaching, with laboratories and with the use of mechanics in the field of railway construction, with the study of railway bridge vibrations and ground vibrations”.

On 1 September 1938, he became deputy professor at the Department of General Mechanics at the Faculty of Civil and Water Engineering of the Lviv Polytechnic. He lectured in general mechanics, strength of materials and hydromechanics. At the meeting of the commission for the filling of the Department of General Mechanics on 18 March 1938, dean Adam Kuryłło stated that “the scientific activity of Dr. Vetulani is so serious that Dr. Vetulani deserves to be appointed a full professor, especially because of his age”. In the same year, the Lviv Polytechnic requested the Ministry of Religious Denominations and Public Enlightenment of Poland to present Vetulani for the nomination as full professor of general mechanics at the Faculty of Civil and Water Engineering.

In June 1939, the Council of the Faculty of Civil Engineering of the Lviv Polytechnic unanimously accepted the postdoctoral dissertation of Kazimierz Vetulani, Considerations in Connection with Horizontal Buckling of the Railway Track on Flat, Rigid and Rough Ground, (Note: Polish: Rozważania w związku z wyboczeniem poziomym toru kolejowego na podłożu płaskim, sztywnym i szorstkim.) which consisted of three papers published or written by Vetulani since 1937. His habilitation lecture General Mechanics Methods and Problems of Technical Mechanics took place on 17 June 1939. The Faculty Council applied to the Minister for approval of the application regarding the right for Kazimierz Vetulani to lecture in the field of general and technical mechanics. On 3 July 1939, Minister Wojciech Świętosławski approved a resolution of the council.

In the academic year 1939/1940 Kazimierz Vetulani was nominated a full professor.

=== Arrest and death ===
A few days after Germany invaded the USSR, Lviv was captured by the Wehrmacht. German authorities planned to murder members of Polish intelligentsia in Lviv. In order to avoid the complications that had previously resulted in the mass arrest of professors in Kraków in 1939, the Germans decided to organize the immediate shooting of professors from Lviv universities, a large number of which were active during the Soviet occupation of the city. The list of names of Polish professors was most likely made and delivered to Germans by Ukrainian students from Kraków, associated with the Organization of Ukrainian Nationalists (OUN). (Note: The list was probably prepared on the basis of Lviv phone book. As Germans attempted to track down professors who died before October 1939, it was suggested that no one had updated and verified the data included in the phone book. See also: Szulc, Wacław (1989). "Wyniki śledztwa w sprawie mordu profesorów lwowskich, prowadzonego przez Główną Komisję Badania Zbrodni Hitlerowskich". Kaźń profesorów lwowskich – lipiec 1941 / studia oraz relacje i dokumenty (in Polish). Wrocław: Wydawnictwo Uniwersytetu Wrocławskiego. pp. 180–181. ISBN 83-229-0351-0.)

Kazimierz Vetulani, according to his cousin Janusz Vetulani, was “respected and liked by students of three denominations and nationalities living in Lviv at the time,” and was “in time warned by Ukrainian students to avoid the area of his apartment for a few days and not stay in it”. However, he was to disregard this warning: “I was present when he visited us (as he did twice a week), mocked these warnings, bragging about his acquaintances among German scholars, and was convinced of his inviolability”.

On the night of 3 July 1941, Kazimierz Vetulani was arrested by the Gestapo and shot along with a group of professors from Lviv universities at the Wuleckie Hills. The execution was carried out by the Einsatzkommando zur besonderen Verwendung (task force for special use) under the command of Brigadeführer Karl Eberhard Schöngarth.

Vetulani's neighbour, Lidia Szargułowa, witnessed his arrest by the Gestapo.

At that time I lived as a child with my mother and family at 31 Obertyńska Street (in Lviv). In the same house, on the second floor lived Professor Kazimierz Vetulani. We were almost eyewitnesses of the Gestapo taking him that memorable July night. (...)

Well, that night we were awakened by a very strong pounding and banging on the gate (it was closed) and screams in German! At the same time (we occupied a flat on the ground floor) our apartment was illuminated through all windows and from all sides with very strong flashlights. We froze in bed.

At that time, the clinking of broken glass could be heard. Some of the Gestapo men broke a window in the second apartment on the ground floor (which was still occupied by a tenant - a Jewish woman) and went up the staircase, and some finally crashed the gate. Of course, none of us moved and we trembled in fear. There was a patter of shoes on the stairs, we heard loud voices on the second floor, pounding on the door of the apartment, which was occupied by Professor Vetulani, then the patter of shoes in the apartment. In just a moment (I stood with my mother at the door and looked through the case) Gestapo men were coming down the stairs with Professor Vetulani, whose figure could be recognized in the dark. Professor whistled softly and dismissively, I will never forget that!

– The account of Professor Kazimierz Vetulani's arrest as delivered by his neighbor, Lidia Szargułowa.

Gestapo men showed great interest in the assets of those arrested. Most of the legacy and personal belongings of Kazimierz Vetulani found in his apartment, including some of his writings, were looted or destroyed during and following his arrest.

The name of Kazimierz Vetulani (written as “Wetulani Franciszek or Kazimierz”) was mentioned twice in the testimony of Stefan Banach, submitted in 1944 to the Soviet authorities, regarding the German murders of Polish scientists and intellectuals. Banach reported that to his knowledge Vetulani had been arrested on the wave of the first arrests in July 1941 and “all hearing of him was lost. They were certainly shot [along with other professors]”. Banach added that he learned of Kazimierz Vetulani's arrest from Vetulani's cousin.

== Scientific work ==
Kazimierz Vetulani was the author of several dozen scientific papers published, among others in the Czasopismo Techniczne (Technical Journal) and Przegląd Techniczny (Technical Review), including over fifteen technical papers, four mathematical papers, one original lecture script and several papers on the theory of musical scales.

He published works in Italian, Spanish, German and English, and was fluent in Italian. He translated into Polish, among others one work and lecture by the Italian scholar Tullio Levi-Civita.

According to the authors of his biography in Wiadomości Matematyczne, Vetulani “also showed great understanding of technical problems by writing papers on practical engineering issues. This is evidenced, for example, by his opinion on the cause of the cracks, the receding and tilting of the wing of the parallel bridgehead on the river Dłubnia of the Kraków-Miechów railway line, and a technical opinion issued in print on the utility of the stone from Mogielnica for communication and construction purposes (...), as well as a lecture on the foundation of the fourth bridge on the Vistula, delivered at the Technical Society in Kraków”.

== Works ==
- Wyznaczanie natężeń normalnych w łukach płaskich (1911)
- Mechanika ogólna i techniczna według wykładów w Akademii Górniczej w Krakowie w roku 1921–22 (1922)
- Obliczanie naprężeń normalnych w przekrojach żelbetowych, pod wpływem kurczenia się betonu (1923)
- Obliczanie pracy istot żywych (1925)
- Konstrukcja wykreślna największego momentu zginającego w zagadnieniu wytrzymałościowem podłużnic skrzydeł samolotu. Przyczynki do artykułu Prof. M. T. Hubera (1930)
- Tłumaczenie z włoskiego na polski odczytu T. Levi-Civity O wysiłku dynamicznym ustrojów sprężystych, wygłoszonego 24 IV 1928 w Wiedniu (1930)
- W sprawie wyboczenia (1930)
- Wartość siły podłużnej podczas powstawania wyboczenia (1931)
- Orzeczenie techniczne o użyteczności kamienia z Mogielnicy dla celów komunikacyjno-budowlanych (1931)
- Sistema dellescale a 7-tte toni (1931)
- Circular models of music scales (1932)
- Una contribución ́a la cuestión del esfuerzo el ́astico de dos cuerpos (1932)
- O zastosowaniu pewnego przedstawienia geometrycznego do biometrii i statystyki (1932)
- Wzór przybliżony dla projektowania nakładek belki blaszanej (1932)
- Przykład ustroju kratowego dopuszczającego układ nieokreślonych sił wewnętrznych (1932)
- Przedstawienie zmiany naprężeń skrajnych podczas powstawania wyboczenia (1932)
- The values of archyp found erroneous in Keiichi Hayashi tables (1932)
- O strugach cieczy (1933); published in Italian as: Suf getti liquidi (1933)
- Uber Anwendung einer geometrischen Darstellung auf Biometrie uns Statistik (1935)
- Rozważania w związku z wyboczeniem poziomym toru kolejowego na podłożu płaskim, sztywnym i szorstkim (1937)
- O pewnym przedstawieniu parametrycznym związanym z ogólnym równaniem 4-go stopnia (1937)
- Wybrzuszenie nieprzerwanego toru kolejowego traktowane zgrubsza jako zjawisko quasi-statyczne (Hypoteza „B”) (1938)
- Przyczynek do Coulomb’owskiej teorii naporu ziemi (1938)
- Wybrzuszenie pionowe toru kolejowego ściskanego podłużnie traktowane elementarnie z grubsza (hipoteza „A”) (1950, pośmiertnie)
- On problems of music scales (manuscript at the Bibliothèque nationale de France)
- Wstęp do rozprawy o problemie skal (manuscript)
- O kompozycji w muzyce

== Distinctions ==
Austro-Hungary

- Golden Civil Merit Cross on the ribbon of Medal for Bravery (before 1916);
- Brown Military Merit Medal on the ribbon of Military Merit Cross (before 1917).

Poland

- “Orlęta” Distinction for fights in defense of Lviv during the Polish-Ukrainian war.

== Commemoration ==
Kazimierz Vetulani's name was on memorial plaques and other objects commemorating the murders of professors from Lviv universities.

During the Jubilee Congress of the Friends of the High School in Sanok on the 70th anniversary of the first Matura on June 21, 1958, the name of Kazimierz Vetulani was mentioned in an appeal to those killed in defense of the homeland in 1939–1945 and on a memorial plaque in the high school devoted to the fallen and murdered high school graduates.

In 1962, Kazimierz Vetulani was commemorated among other people mentioned on the plaque of the Mausoleum of Victims of World War II at the Central Cemetery in Sanok.

== Family ==
Vetulani family

* the list is incomplete

Michał Vetulani	Franciszka (née Śliwińska)
Jan	Matylda (née Pisz)	Roman	Elżbieta (née Kunachowicz)	Franciszek; Latinik	Franciszek	Katarzyna (née Ipohorska)
Eugeniusz	Kazimierz	Zygmunt	Tadeusz	Maria (née Godlewska)	Adam	Irena (née Latinik)	Zofia	Bohdan de Nisau	Maria	Cecylia
Armand	Wanda	Zygmunt	Grażyna (née Świerczyńska)	Krystyna	Jerzy	Maria (née Pająk)	Witold
Agnieszka	Maria	Charles	Tomasz

== Bibliography ==
- Maligranda, Lech; Prytuła, Jarosław G. (2013). "Lwowscy uczeni wymienieni w przesłuchaniach Banacha" (PDF). Wiadomości Matematyczne (in Polish). 49 (1): 29–66. doi:10.14708/wm.v49i1.434.
- Myćka-Kril, Maria (1958). "Dorobek nauczycieli i uczniów Gimnazjum w Sanoku". Księga pamiątkowa Gimnazjum Męskiego w Sanoku 1888–1958 (in Polish). Kraków: Państwowe Wydawnictwo Naukowe. pp. 105–106.
- Albert, Zygmunt (1989). Kaźń profesorów lwowskich – lipiec 1941 / studia oraz relacje i dokumenty (in Polish). Wrocław: Wydawnictwo Uniwersytetu Wrocławskiego. ISBN 83-229-0351-0.
- Popławski, Zbysław (1994). "Kazimierz Franciszek Vetulani". Wykaz pracowników naukowych Politechniki Lwowskiej w latach 1844–1945 (in Polish). Kraków: Politechnika Krakowska im. Tadeusza Kościuszki. p. 196.
- Popławski, Zbysław (2002). Dzieje Politechniki Lwowskiej 1844–1945 (in Polish). Wrocław: Ossolineum. pp. 251, 253, 320.
