= Agnieszka Vetulani-Cęgiel =

Polish political scientist (born 1981)

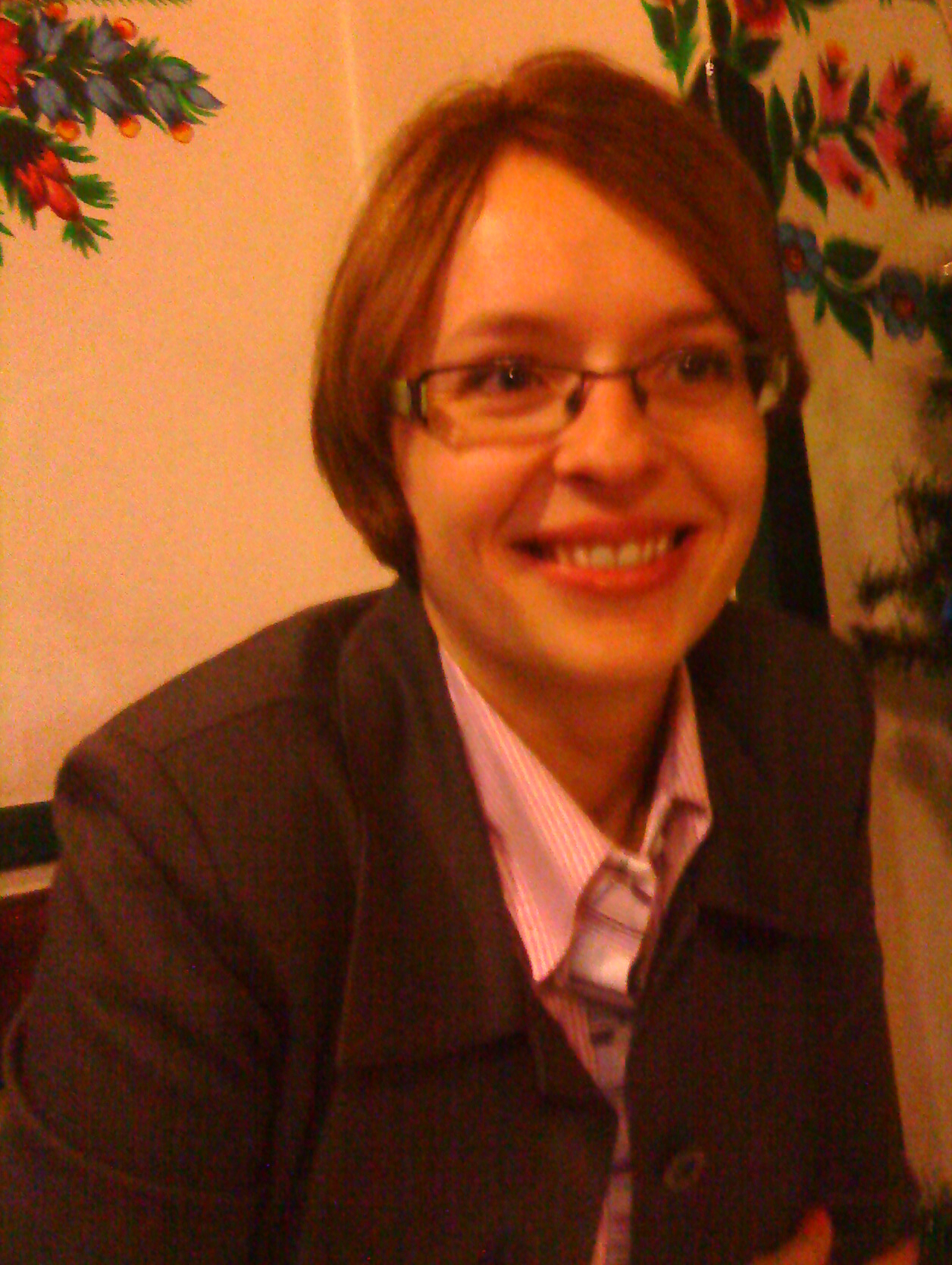
- Agnieszka Vetulani-Cęgiel, 2012
- Born: Agnieszka Vetulani; 30 March 1981; Poznań, Poland
- Citizenship: Polish
- Occupations: political scientist, jurisprudent
- Employer: Adam Mickiewicz University in Poznań
- Parent(s): Zygmunt Vetulani; Grażyna Małgorzata Vetulani (née Świerczyńska)

Academic background
- Education: Adam Mickiewicz University in Poznań
- Doctoral advisor: Ryszard Markiewicz

Agnieszka Vetulani-Cęgiel (born 30 March 1981) is a Polish political scientist and jurisprudent, Associated Professor at the Adam Mickiewicz University in Poznań and Head of the Research Unit of Politics and Governance of Digitalisation at Collegium Polonicum in Słubice.

== Biography ==
Agnieszka Vetulani was born in 1981 to Zygmunt Vetulani and Grażyna Małgorzata Vetulani (née Świerczyńska). She graduated with a master's degree in European studies from the Adam Mickiewicz University in Poznań, Faculty of Law and Administration in 2005, before obtaining a PhD in political science from the Jagiellonian University (supervised by Ryszard Markiewicz) in 2012 and a habilitation in political science and administration from the Adam Mickiewicz University in Poznań in 2022. In 2007 she graduated with a master's degree in arts from the Ignacy Jan Paderewski Academy of Music in Poznań in the field of instrumental studies; instrumental pedagogy, in the piano class.

Between 2007 and 2008 she was a stagiaire at the European Commission, at the Directorate-General Information Society and Media in Luxemburg. Next, between 2008 and 2010 she worked in the Office of the Committee for European Integration, at the Department for Institution Building Programmes in Warsaw; and continued as a consultant for EU-funded projects (BBF, Poznań) between 2010 and 2013.

She became an Associate Member of ENS. Since 2015, she has been a Member of the Civic Legislative Forum at the Stefan Batory Foundation in Warsaw.

Her research concentrates on interest groups and their political activity in the public sphere (EU and national levels). She explores lobbying and policy advice in policymaking and legislative processes and links them with regulatory environment and, more broadly, with democratic governance. She also looks at changes brought about by digitilisation processes in related issues (political participation, interest representation, campaigns and lobbying strategies, regulatory governance, stakeholder consultation etc.). Among other of her interests lay legal apsects of the aforementioned issues, as well as the development of sectoral policies such as copyright law, media sector, the EU digital single market.

She authored two monographs (2014, 2020) and co-edited another one (2018). She has published as a co-author over twenty articles in peer-reviewed journals, among others, in Interest Groups & Advocacy (2021) and Journal of European Integration (2021). Her work has been supported by grants of the National Science Centre, Poland (2014–2020) and the German-Polish Science Foundation (2020–2022).

== Family tree ==
Vetulani family

* the list is incomplete

Michał Vetulani	Franciszka (née Śliwińska)
Jan	Matylda (née Pisz)	Roman	Elżbieta (née Kunachowicz)	Franciszek; Latinik	Franciszek	Katarzyna (née Ipohorska)
Eugeniusz	Kazimierz	Zygmunt	Tadeusz	Maria (née Godlewska)	Adam	Irena (née Latinik)	Zofia	Bohdan de Nisau	Maria	Cecylia
Armand	Wanda	Zygmunt	Grażyna (née Świerczyńska)	Krystyna	Jerzy	Maria (née Pająk)	Witold
Agnieszka	Maria	Charles	Tomasz
