= Tadeusz Vetulani =

Polish agriculturalist and biologist (1897–1952)

Tadeusz Bolesław Vetulani
- Born: 13 March 1897; Sanok, Kingdom of Galicia and Lodomeria, Austria-Hungary
- Died: 24 February 1952 (aged 54); Kraków
- Citizenship: Polish
- Occupation: Biologist

Tadeusz Bolesław Vetulani (13 March 1897 – 24 February 1952) was a Polish agriculturalist and biologist, associate professor of Adam Mickiewicz University in animal husbandry. He was a pioneer of biodiversity research in Poland and conducted notable research into forest tarpan and the Polish koniks, launching restoration and breeding schemes.

== Biography ==
Vetulani was born in Sanok in 1897, the son of Roman and Elżbieta Kunachowicz, and brother of Kazimierz, a professor of Lvov University, Adam, a professor of Jagiellonian University, Zygmunt, Maria, and Elżbieta.

In the years 1915–1916 he studied philosophy at the University of Vienna, and in the years 1919–1922 at Jagiellonian University in agriculture. In the years 1922–1929 he published work on the Polish konik (Badania nad konikiem polskim z okolic Biłgoraja and Dalsze badania nad konikiem polskim). He is credited with introducing the term Polish konik into the hippological literature in the mid-1920s.Zbigniew Jaworski of the Polish Academy of Sciences says that "based on his research and observations, he hypothesized that a forest variety of the tarpan (Equus cab. gmelini Ant., forma silvatica Vet.) had split off from the populations living in the steppes of Eastern Europe and had survived into the mid 18th century in the lands of Poland, Lithuania, and Prussia."

In 1926, Vetulani received a doctoral degree in agriculture at the Jagiellonian University. Three years later he obtained his degree of associate professor in animal husbandry. From 1931 to 1935 he worked as an associate professor and head of the Department of Animal Breeding at the Stefan Batory University in Vilnius. In February 1936, he founded a reserve and restoration scheme in Białowieża Forest involving the breeding of Polish koniks, putting his early hypothesis to practice. Helmut Hemmer says that "Tadeusz Vetulani purchased animals with particularly high resemblance to tarpans and subjected them to a selection programme carried out in the Institute for Genetics and Animal Breeding of the Polish Academy."

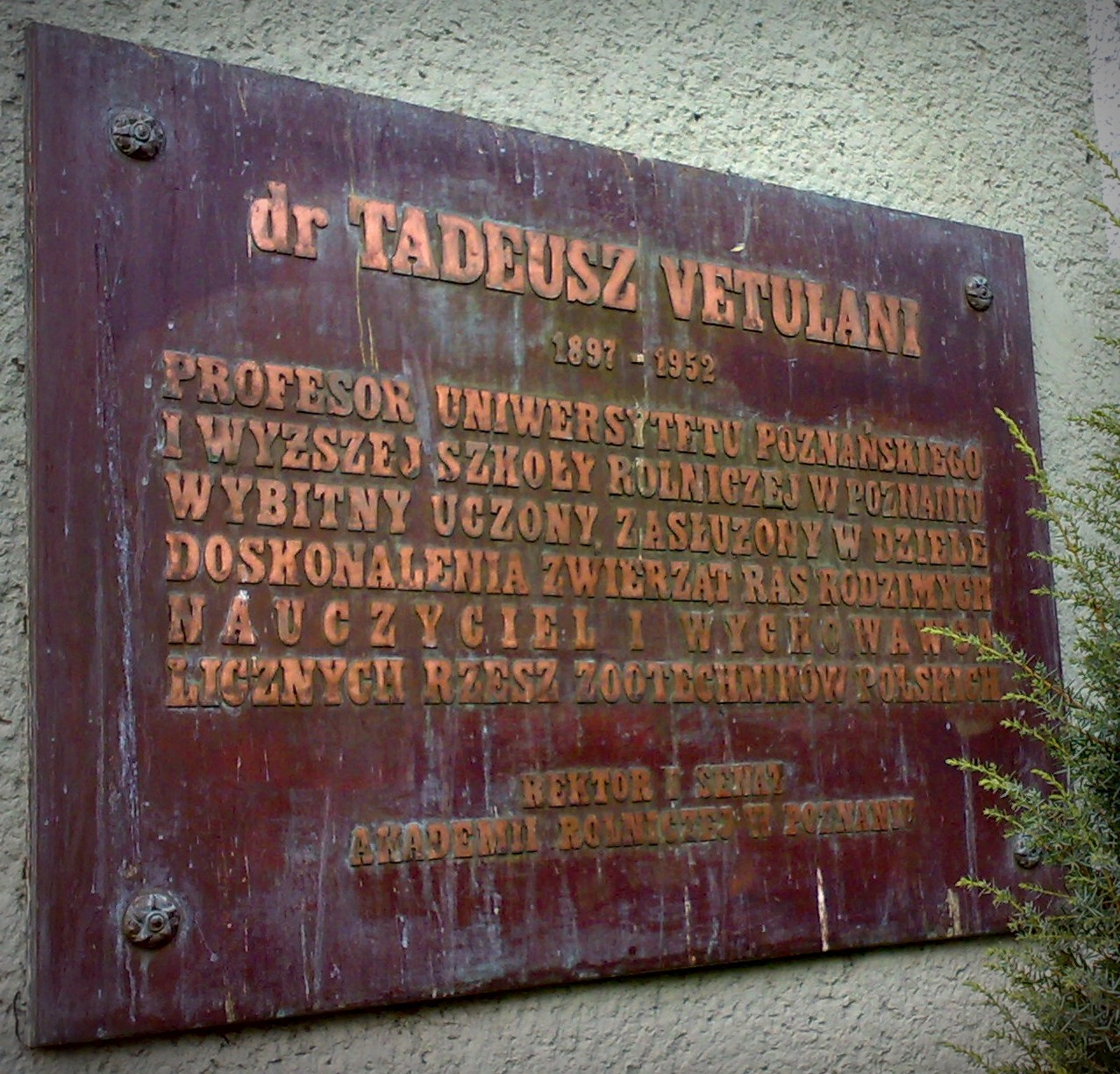
Plaque of Vetulani in Poznań

From 1938, Vetulani was co-editor of the German journal "Zeitschrift für Züchtungsbiologie." In 1939 he represented Poland in Zürich in an international conference on breeding.

During World War II, the horses introduced by Vetulani to Białowieża were removed by German brothers Heinz Heck and Lutz Heck and brought to Munich and Berlin to be used as breeding stock for their own attempt to recreate the tarpan, which would ultimately produce a horse breed known as Heck horses. Vetulani viewed this as a "baffling campaign of destruction", and the removal of the animals ultimately ended his breeding program.

During World War II Vetulani lived in Kraków, working as a clerk in the Polish Red Cross from 1940 to 1943. He was a spokesperson for the organization against the occupation authorities. He also aided in the care of Polish prisoners of war. Vetulani rejected all proposals for collaboration with the Nazis and also refused to join the committee appointed to audit the Katyn graves, not wanting to serve the German propaganda.

Between 1945 and 1952 worked in restoration and increasing the breeding of the Polish konik. In 1949 he received the full title of Professor of Animal Husbandry.

On 5 June 1949 he married Marie Godlewska. Their son Zygmunt was born in 1950.

Tadeusz Vetulani died of a heart attack on 24 February 1952. He had fainted while working in a laboratory in Krakow during a scientific trip, and died the same day. He was buried at the Rakowicki Cemetery.

== Family tree ==
Vetulani family

* the list is incomplete

Michał Vetulani	Franciszka (née Śliwińska)
Jan	Matylda (née Pisz)	Roman	Elżbieta (née Kunachowicz)	Franciszek; Latinik	Franciszek	Katarzyna (née Ipohorska)
Eugeniusz	Kazimierz	Zygmunt	Tadeusz	Maria (née Godlewska)	Adam	Irena (née Latinik)	Zofia	Bohdan de Nisau	Maria	Cecylia
Armand	Wanda	Zygmunt	Grażyna (née Świerczyńska)	Krystyna	Jerzy	Maria (née Pająk)	Witold
Agnieszka	Maria	Charles	Tomasz
