= Roman Vetulani =

Polish high school professor (1849–1908)

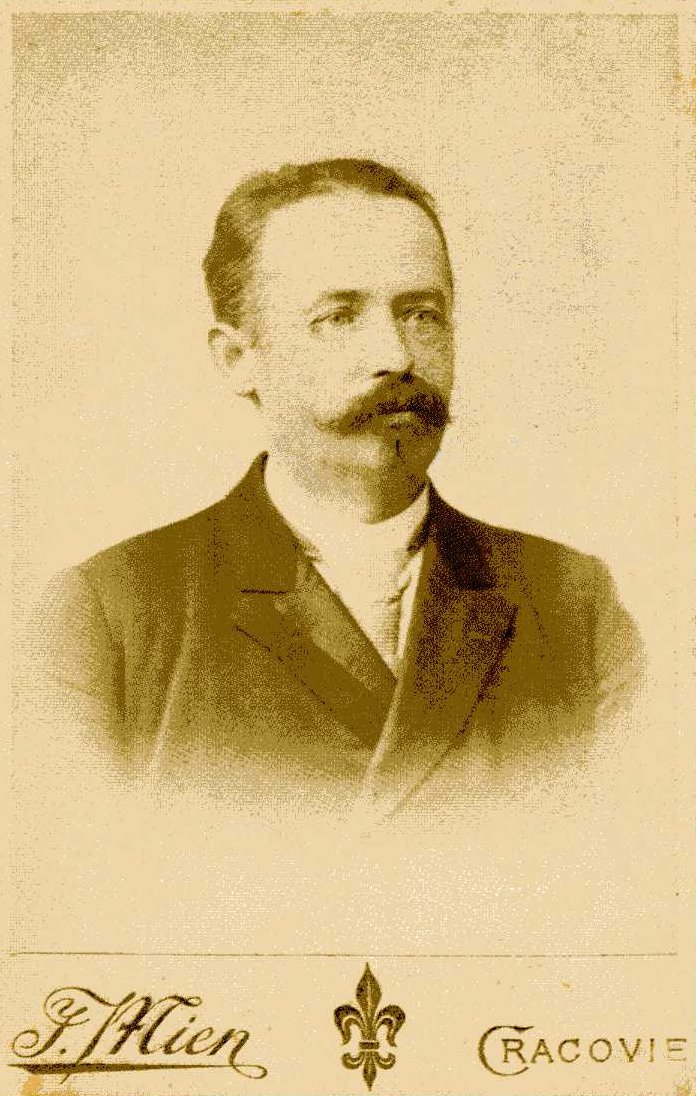
- Roman Vetulani in 1893
- Born: 8 August 1849; Bochnia
- Died: 12 August 1908 (aged 59); Zawoja
- Citizenship: Polish
- Spouse: Elżbieta née Kunachowicz
- Children: Kazimierz Vetulani; Zygmunt Vetulani; Tadeusz Vetulani; Adam Vetulani; Maria Vetulani; Elżbieta Vetulani

Roman Vetulani (8 August 1849 – 12 August 1908) was a Polish high school professor, secretary of the "Sokół" gymnastics organization chapter in Sanok, honorary member of Macierz Ziemi Cieszyńskiej since 1898.

== Biography ==
He was born in Bochnia in 1849 as the son of a father of Italian descent, Michał Vetulani, and a Polish mother, Franciszka Śliwińska. Roman Vetulani graduated in classical philology from Lviv University. He had six children: Kazimierz (professor of Lviv University), Zygmunt (diplomat), Tadeusz (professor of Adam Mickiewicz University in animal husbandry), Adam (historian of medieval law and canonist, professor of Jagiellonian University), Maria, and Elżbieta (died in childhood). Roman Vetulani died on 12 August 1908 in Zawoja, Poland. As his grandson Jerzy said, he died in consequence of heart disease.

== Family tree ==
Vetulani family

* the list is incomplete

Michał Vetulani	Franciszka (née Śliwińska)
Jan	Matylda (née Pisz)	Roman	Elżbieta (née Kunachowicz)	Franciszek; Latinik	Franciszek	Katarzyna (née Ipohorska)
Eugeniusz	Kazimierz	Zygmunt	Tadeusz	Maria (née Godlewska)	Adam	Irena (née Latinik)	Zofia	Bohdan de Nisau	Maria	Cecylia
Armand	Wanda	Zygmunt	Grażyna (née Świerczyńska)	Krystyna	Jerzy	Maria (née Pająk)	Witold
Agnieszka	Maria	Charles	Tomasz
