= Zofia Vetulani =

Polish civil servant (1893–1981)

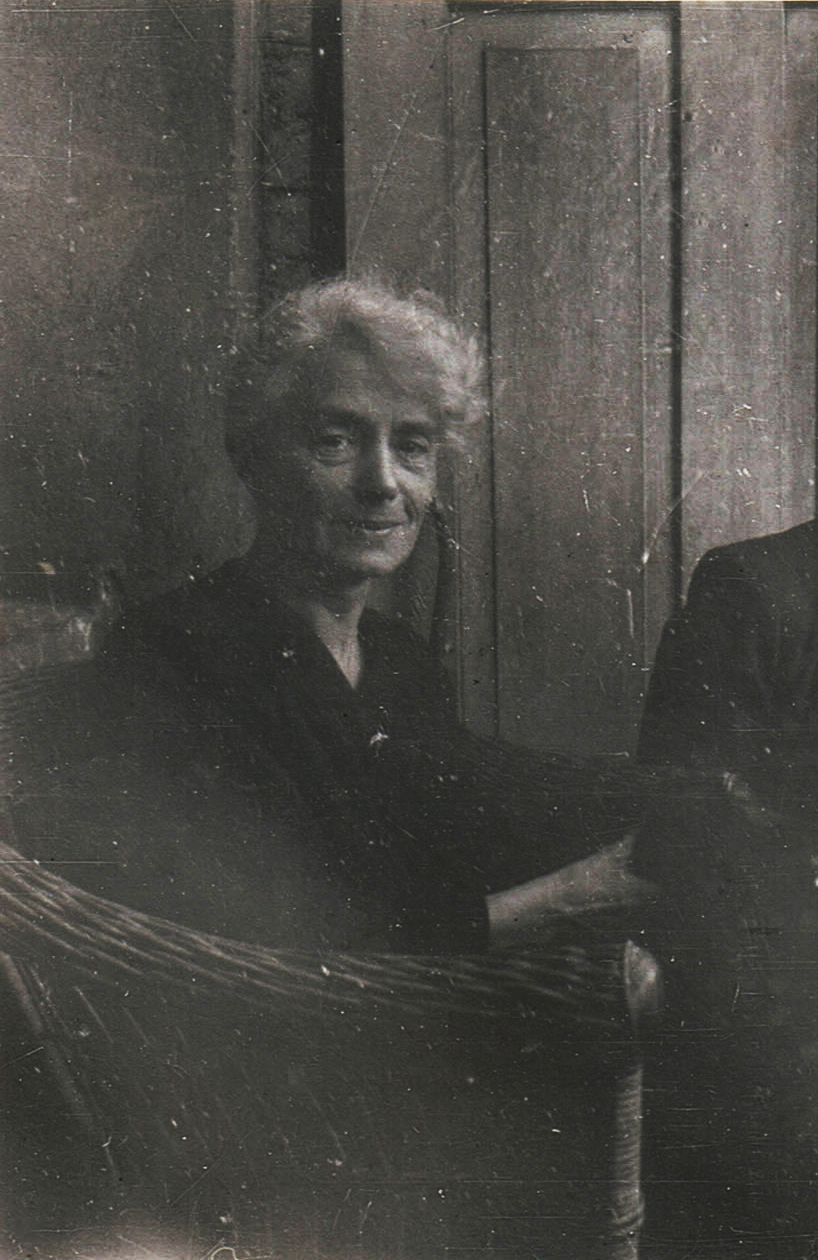
- Vetulani in 1953
- Born: Zofia Julia Vetulani; 30 March 1893 (Note: Some sources incorrectly indicate the date of birth 31 March 1893. See: Syrwid, Robert (2012). ""Ambasadorka Watykanu", czyli Cecylii Vetulani potyczki z władzą ludową. Nieznany list do Komisji Kultury Wojewódzkiej Rady Narodowej w Olsztynie z 1955 roku" (PDF). Komunikaty Mazursko-Warmińskie (in Polish). 2: 375–399.); Tarnów
- Died: 23 September 1981 (aged 88); Warsaw
- Citizenship: Polish
- Occupation: civil servant

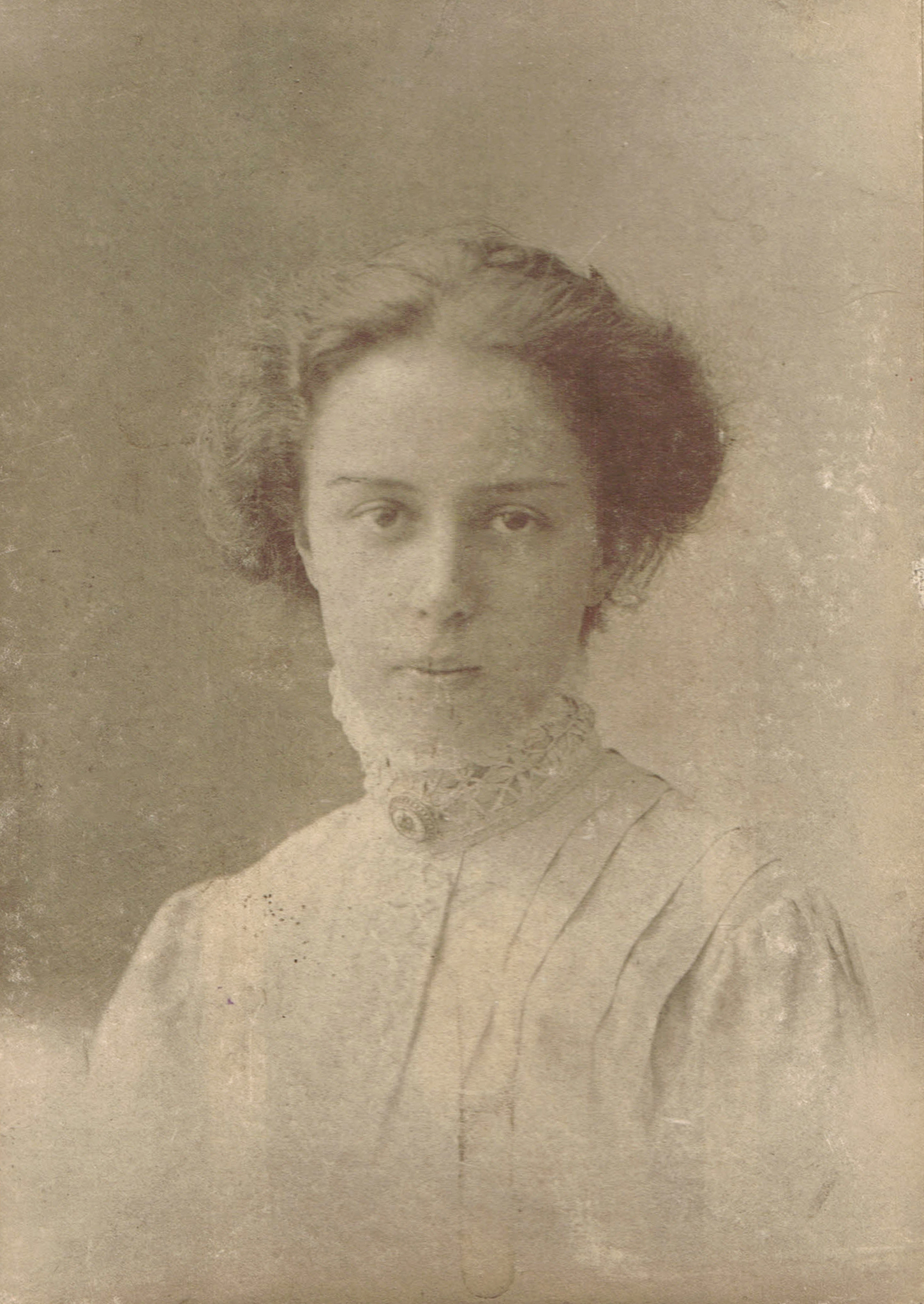
Zofia Vetulani, c. 1910

Zofia Julia Vetulani (30 March 1893 – 23 September 1981) was a Polish civil servant, as well as a social and political activist.

An official of Poland's Ministry of the Interior in the Second Polish Republic (1921–1939), she was interned in Romania after the outbreak of World War II (1939–1945). There, she was the secretary of the board of the women's circle at the American Commission for Aid to Poles – YMCA in the refugee camp in Brăila, and later in Drăgășani, as well as the secretary of the Consul General of the Republic of Poland Jerzy Lechowski. In the Polish People's Republic, she worked as a high-rank official at the financial and budget departments of the Provincial Office (Urząd Wojewódzki) and the Presidium of the Provincial National Council (Wojewódzka Rada Narodowa) in Olsztyn (1945–1958).

== Biography ==
Zofia Vetulani was born in 1893 in Tarnów. She was the daughter of Franciszek Vetulani (1856–1921), an engineer, and Katarzyna née Ipohorska-Lenkiewicz (1868–1916). She had siblings: brother Stanisław and sisters Maria and Cecylia.

She graduated from the Helena Strażyńska Private Female Junior High School in Kraków in 1911. Between 1911 and 1916 she studied philosophy at the Jagiellonian University in Kraków and at the Jan Kazimierz University in Lviv. In 1917 she completed a one-year course for high school graduates from the Kraków Academy of Commerce (Akademia Handlowa w Krakowie).

She started her career as an aspirant of the box office at the Municipal Savings Bank of the City of Tarnów (1 January 1918 – 31 December 1920). On 1 January 1921, she was employed at the budget department of the Ministry of the Interior in Warsaw, where she worked successively as an intern, controller and treasurer in the rank of referendary, until the outbreak of World War II.

On September 7, 1939, after the German invasion of Poland, Zofia Vetulani was evacuated from Warsaw at the request of the interior minister, with the order to export money, seals and ministerial documents from the country. Ten days later, together with some members of the government, she crossed the Polish-Romanian border. She kept the deposit entrusted to her until 22 November 1939, when she transferred it to the office director of the Ministry of the Interior, Antoni Robaczewski. The funds were deposited on the account of the State Property Protection Commission at the Embassy of the Republic of Poland in Bucharest.

Throughout the war, Zofia Vetulani was interned in Romania. From December 1939 to February 1940, she served as the social secretary of the women's circle board at the American Commission for Aid to Poles – YMCA in the Brăila refugee camp. From February to August 1940, she was the secretary of Jerzy Lechowski, the Consul General of the Republic of Poland for the districts of Brăila, Galați and Tulcea. Between November 1940 and March 1941, she again became the secretary of the women's circle at the ACAP YMCA in Drăgășani. Then she was the chairwoman of the women's club in Craiova (November 1941 – November 1943) and a physical worker at the Polish shoemaker's workshop in Craiova (March 1944 – June 1945). In the spring of 1945 she joined the Union of Polish Patriots in Craiova.

In July 1945, upon returning to Poland, Zofia Vetulani volunteered to work at the Ministry of Public Administration with a request for a delegation to Olsztyn. There, she lived with her sister Cecylia and her nephew Witold de Nisau in an apartment at 7 Warmińska Street. On August 21, 1945, she was employed as an official in the Finance Department of the Office of the Government Plenipotentiary of the Republic of Poland in the Masurian District. From the beginning of 1947, she was the head of the accounting control department of the Budget and Economic Department of the Provincial Office in Olsztyn (Urząd Wojewódzki).

From January 1, 1948, by order of the Ministry of Recovered Territories, she was qualified to a group of employees „of exceptionally high professional qualifications in the field of general administration” and was promoted to the rank of referendary in the VIIth service group with the right to a higher salary. From 1 January 1949 to 4 June 1950, she was an independent accountant and referendary at the Budget and Economic Department of the Provincial Office, and from 5 June 1950 to 1 January 1955 at the Finance Department of the Presidium of the Provincial National Council (Wojewódzka Rada Narodowa). Then she took the position of senior accountant in the same department. On 30 June 1958 she was retired.

She was a member of the Labor Party (Stronnictwo Pracy) and the Alliance of Democrats (Stronnictwo Demokratyczne).

She died in Warsaw on 23 September 1981. She was buried in the family tomb at the Powązki Cemetery in Warsaw. (Note: In the quarters 218, row 3, number 27.)

== Awards ==
- Silver Cross of Merit
- Medal of the Decade of Regained Independence (not before 1928)
- Silver Cross of Merit (for the second time, 1938)
- Silver Cross of Merit (for the third time, 1948)

== Family ==
Vetulani family

* the list is incomplete

Michał Vetulani	Franciszka (née Śliwińska)
Jan	Matylda (née Pisz)	Roman	Elżbieta (née Kunachowicz)	Franciszek; Latinik	Franciszek	Katarzyna (née Ipohorska)
Eugeniusz	Kazimierz	Zygmunt	Tadeusz	Maria (née Godlewska)	Adam	Irena (née Latinik)	Zofia	Bohdan de Nisau	Maria	Cecylia
Armand	Wanda	Zygmunt	Grażyna (née Świerczyńska)	Krystyna	Jerzy	Maria (née Pająk)	Witold
Agnieszka	Maria	Charles	Tomasz
