= Franciszek Vetulani =

Polish engineer (1856–1921)

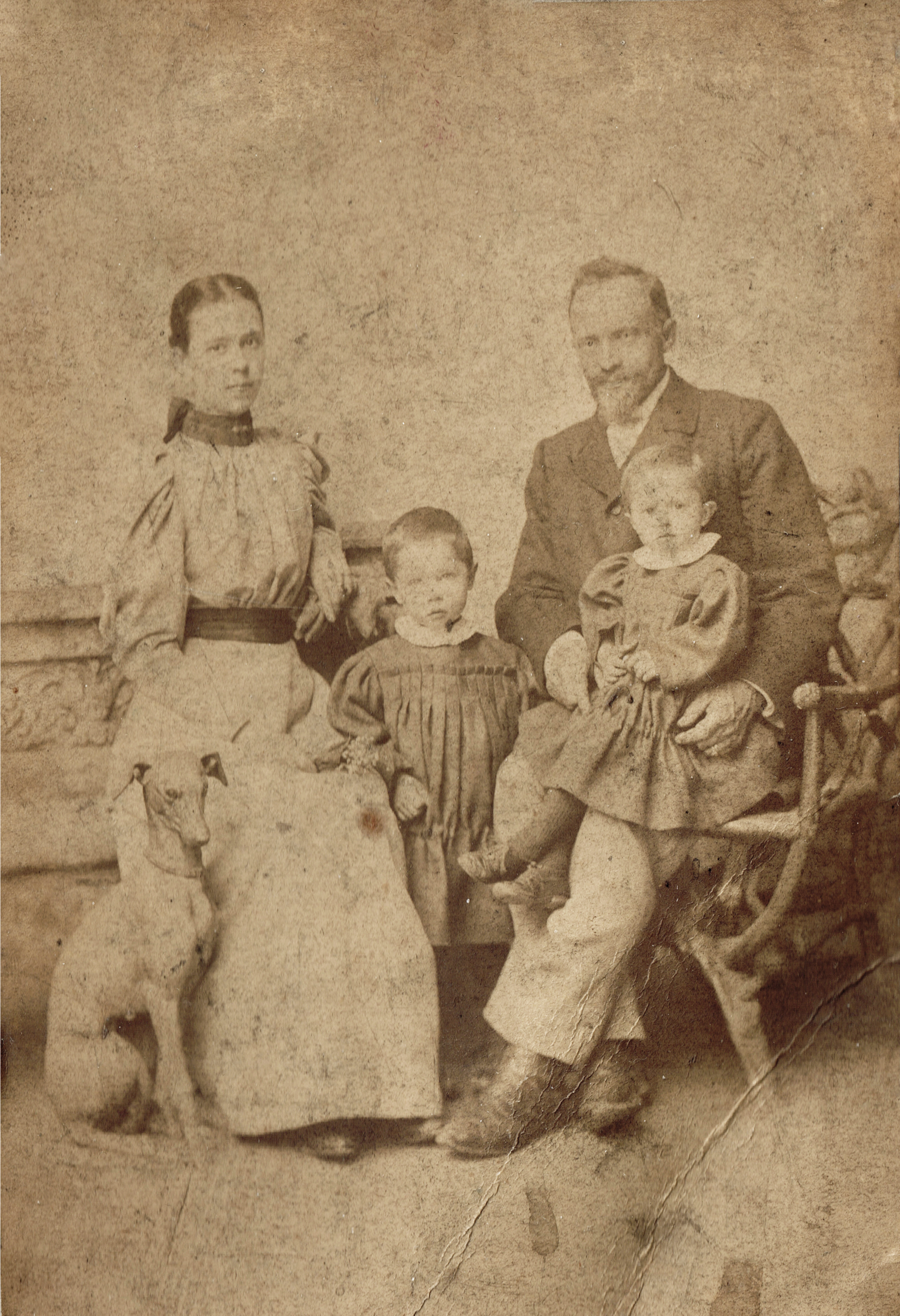
- Franciszek Vetulani with his family.
- Born: 15 November 1856; Bochnia
- Died: 11 December 1921 (aged 65); Warsaw
- Citizenship: Austrian; Polish
- Occupation: engineer

Franciszek Ksawery Vetulani (15 November 1856 – 11 December 1921) was a Polish engineer.

== Biography ==
He was born in Bochnia as the son of Michał Vetulani and Franciszka née Śliwińska. He had brothers Jan (1843–1918) and Roman (1849–1906) and sisters Aniela and Józefa. He attended Realschule and graduated with a maturity exam. Then he studied at the Lviv Polytechnic from 1873 until 1878. That year he obtained an engineer degree. He passed a second national exam. To learn, he travelled around Europe, visiting several countries including Germany and Czech Republic. He worked in Tarnów as a second-class engineer and in 1892 was made first-class engineer. Working as a clerk at the drainage office of the National Department in Lviv at the end of 1890s he was a director of the management office of the national branch of drainage in Tarnow. In 1911 as a senior engineer he was a head of construction-branches in Kraków. He obtained a title of construction engineer of the Austro-Hungarian Empire.

On 15 May 1903 he became a member of the department of agricultural society in Tarnów. Thanks to his efforts the Governorship of Galicia granted loans for the construction of school barracks in Pogórska Wola, Łęka Siedlecka, Golanka and Wołowa ad Tuchów, where the original school buildings were burnt after the invasion of the Great War.

He died on 11 December 1921 in Warsaw and was buried at the Powązki Cemetery.

He was married to Katarzyna Ipohorska-Lenkiewicz coat of arms Kotwicz (1868–1915). They had four children: Stanisław, Maria (1898–1944, combatant for Poland's independence), Zofia and Cecylia (1908–1980, an art historian).

== Family tree ==
Vetulani family

* the list is incomplete

Michał Vetulani	Franciszka (née Śliwińska)
Jan	Matylda (née Pisz)	Roman	Elżbieta (née Kunachowicz)	Franciszek; Latinik	Franciszek	Katarzyna (née Ipohorska)
Eugeniusz	Kazimierz	Zygmunt	Tadeusz	Maria (née Godlewska)	Adam	Irena (née Latinik)	Zofia	Bohdan de Nisau	Maria	Cecylia
Armand	Wanda	Zygmunt	Grażyna (née Świerczyńska)	Krystyna	Jerzy	Maria (née Pająk)	Witold
Agnieszka	Maria	Charles	Tomasz
