= Irena Latinik-Vetulani =

Polish biologist (1904–1975)

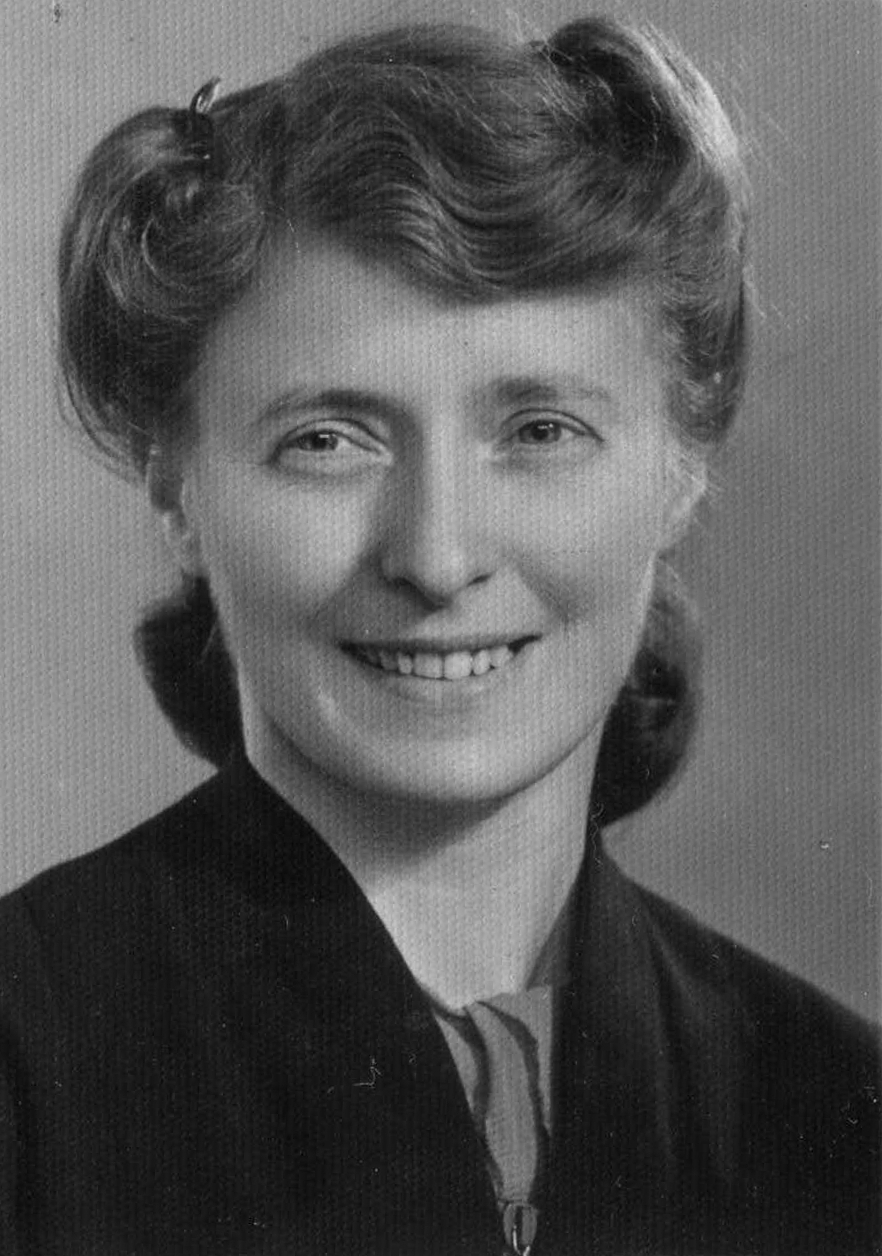
- Born: Irena Stefania Latinik; 26 December 1904
- Died: 2 February 1975 (aged 70)
- Resting place: Rakowicki Cemetery
- Citizenship: Polish
- Education: Jagiellonian University
- Occupation: biologist
- Spouse: Adam Vetulani
- Children: Jerzy Vetulani; Jan Vetulani
- Parent(s): Franciszek Latinik; Helena Latinik

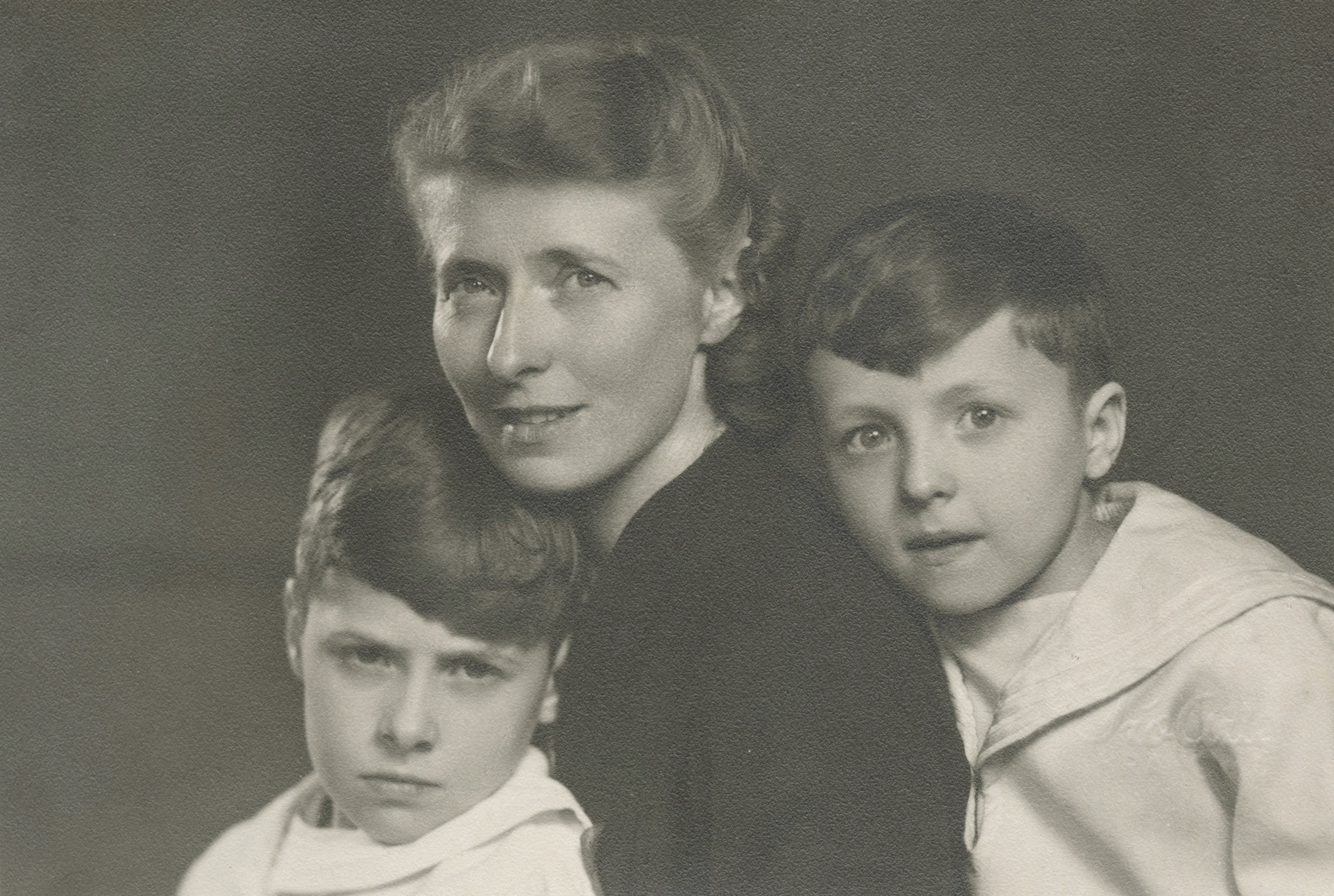
Irena Latinik-Vetulani with her two sons: Jerzy (left) and Jan (right), 1940s

Irena Stefania Latinik-Vetulani (26 December 1904 – 2 February 1975) was a Polish biologist.

== Biography ==
She was the daughter of Polish Army general Franciszek Ksawery Latinik and his wife Helena. She had two sisters: Anna (1902–1969) and Antonina (1906–1989). She graduated in philosophy from Jagiellonian University and later went to Station biologique de Roscoff for scientific practice. After she returned to Poland, she was an assistant of professor Emil Godlewski Jr. in his laboratory. In 1927 she received her Ph.D. and Godlewski was her promoter. She worked on amphibian regeneration. Until 1938 she was an assistant to professor Henryk Hoyer.

In 1927 she married Adam Vetulani. They had two sons: Jerzy (1936–2017) and Jan (1938–1965).

She published two popular science books: Krążenie pierwiastków w przyrodzie (The Circulation of Elements in Nature, Książnica-Atlas, Warszawa, 1938) and Regeneracja, odtwarzanie utraconych części ciała (Regenaration of body parts, Czytelnik, Łódź, 1950). For many years she was publishing short articles in Wszechświat, a popular science monthly.

Vetulani spent World War II in Kraków, where she was working as a translator and taking care of her two children. She was raising her sons with a patriotic sense of honour. On 18 January 1945, which was the last day of German occupation in Kraków, she went to the window to open it to prevent it from breaking in case of a bomb explosion. At the same time there was an explosion outside and she was wounded by a shrapnel. She survived, however a piece of iron remained in her head for the rest of her life. Vetulani lost power over her left hand and her eyesight was reduced.

In 1965 her younger son, Jan, drowned in the Dunajec during a canoeing trip.

She died on 5 February 1975 and was buried at Rakowicki Cemetery.

== Family tree ==
Vetulani family

* the list is incomplete

Michał Vetulani	Franciszka (née Śliwińska)
Jan	Matylda (née Pisz)	Roman	Elżbieta (née Kunachowicz)	Franciszek; Latinik	Franciszek	Katarzyna (née Ipohorska)
Eugeniusz	Kazimierz	Zygmunt	Tadeusz	Maria (née Godlewska)	Adam	Irena (née Latinik)	Zofia	Bohdan de Nisau	Maria	Cecylia
Armand	Wanda	Zygmunt	Grażyna (née Świerczyńska)	Krystyna	Jerzy	Maria (née Pająk)	Witold
Agnieszka	Maria	Charles	Tomasz
