= Kristine Vetulani-Belfoure =

Polish translator

Eva Kristine Vetulani-Belfoure
- Born: October 1, 1924; Kraków
- Died: March 25, 2004 (aged 79); Baltimore
- Citizenship: Polish; American
- Occupations: Translator; Teacher; Writer

Eva Kristine Vetulani-Belfoure (October 1, 1924 – March 25, 2004) was a Polish teacher, translator, activist and writer who emigrated to the United States in 1950.

== Biography ==
=== Europe ===
She was born in Kraków, the daughter of Adam Vetulani and Anna Szewczyk, she was a half-sister of Jerzy and Jan Vetulani. Raised in a Catholic family, by the age of five she lived in the country. Then she moved to the city to start education in the elementary school. Once World War II started in 1939, she attended underground classes. She studied several foreign languages, first French, and later German, as her son said, heeding her father's advice: “Learn your enemy's language”. During the war her family adopted a Jewish woman, saving her from the Nazis.

In 1942 she was taken to Germany and forced to work as slave laborer in the Nazis' factory. She first worked at Hamewacker Chewing Tobacco in Nordhausen and was later sent to the ammunition factory Schmidt, Kranz & Co. She worked as kitchen help and as an interpreter. She was also a maid in the household of the company owner before she was liberated in 1945.

Vetulani started studying romance philology at Johann Wolfgang Goethe-Universität Frankfurt am Main, but she did not graduate from the university.

=== U.S. ===
Anticipating another German-Soviet war, she decided to leave Europe. In 1950 she emigrated to the United States, settling in St. Louis, where she attended Washington University.

After moving to Maryland, she graduated from Frostburg State Teachers College in 1962. In 1966 she earned a master's degree in French and German from Middlebury College in Vermont. Shortly after graduating from Frostburg College she began work at Woodlawn High School, where she taught French, German and Spanish. She retired in 1988.

After she retired from teaching, Vetulani worked as a volunteer for the United States Holocaust Memorial Museum in Washington, D.C., where she translated historical documents. She also worked in the Tracing Bureau of the American Red Cross, attempting to reunite Holocaust survivors with their families.

She continued an active letter correspondence with her father in Poland (until Adam Vetulani's death in 1976).

She published three memoir books in Polish.

Eva Kristine Vetulani-Belfoure died on March 25, 2004, of heart failure at Northwest Hospital Center in Randallstown, Baltimore. Her son remembered that despite the fact "she had seen the absolute worst in life, people executed in front of her eyes, she had an amazingly cheerful disposition and outlook on life."

=== Family ===
She married Charles William Belfoure, a second class yeoman of the U.S. Navy. Their son Charles Belfoure is an architect and writer.

== Works ==
- W małym niemieckim miasteczku (In a Little German Town, published by Tasso, Kraków 1993). A German translation titled In einem deutschen Städtchen was published in 2000;
- Z Ziemi Egipskiej, z domu niewoli… (From Egyptian Land, From the House of Slavery…, Czuwajmy, Kraków 1997);
- Ameryka. Marzenie a rzeczywistość (America. Dream and Reality, Czuwajmy, Kraków 2000).

== Family tree ==
Vetulani family

* the list is incomplete

Michał Vetulani | Franciszka (née Śliwińska)
Jan | Matylda (née Pisz) | Roman | Elżbieta (née Kunachowicz) | Franciszek; Latinik | Franciszek | Katarzyna (née Ipohorska)
Eugeniusz | Kazimierz | Zygmunt | Tadeusz | Maria (née Godlewska) | Adam | Irena (née Latinik) | Zofia | Bohdan de Nisau | Maria | Cecylia
Armand | Wanda | Zygmunt | Grażyna (née Świerczyńska) | Krystyna | Jerzy | Maria (née Pająk) | Witold
Agnieszka | Maria | Charles | Tomasz
