= Liquidation of the insurgent hospitals in Warsaw's Old Town =

Massacre of wounded Warsaw insurgents

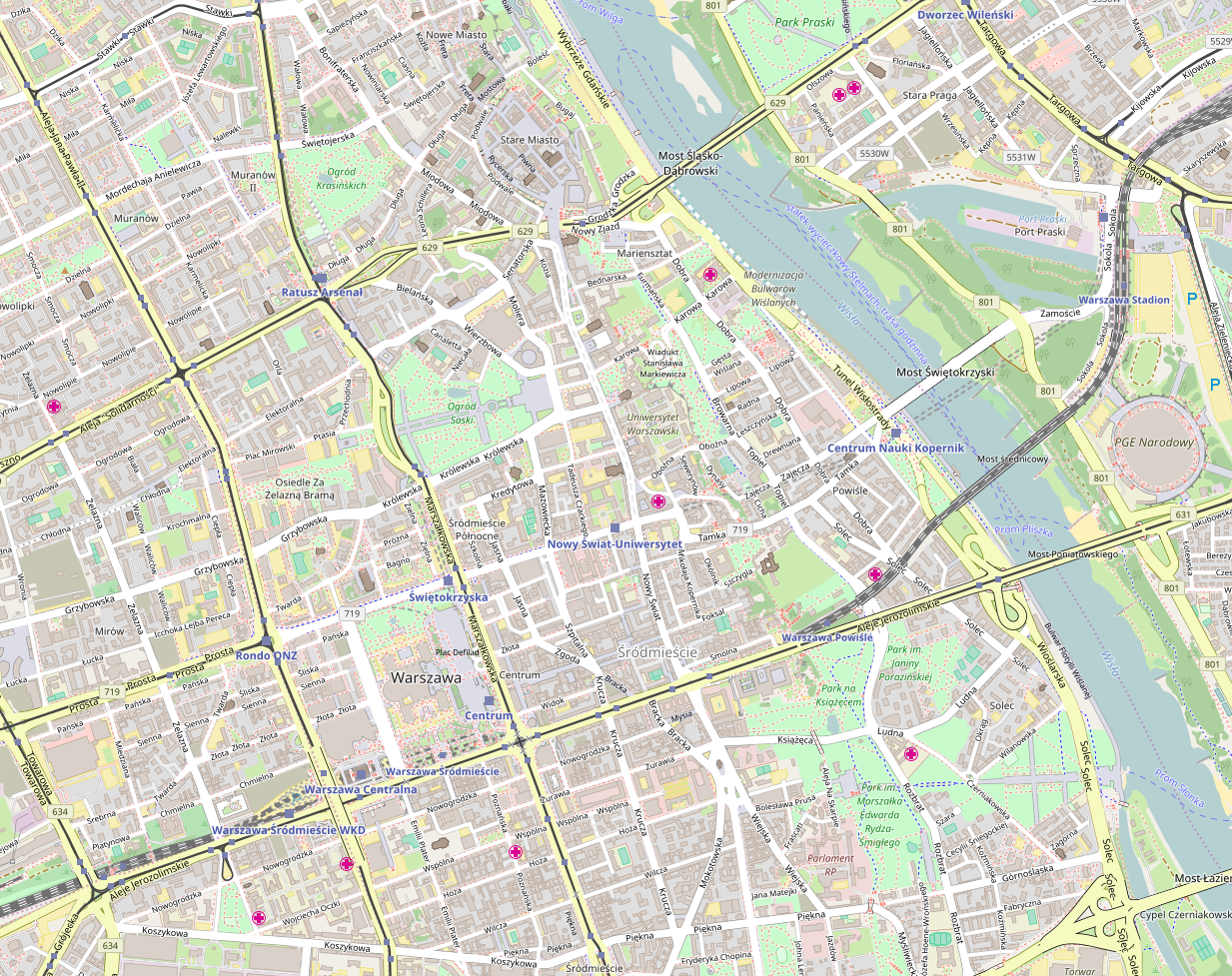
Hospitals where wounded soldiers were located.

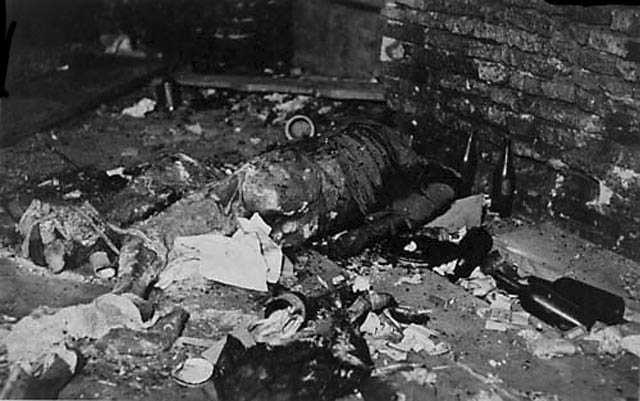
Remains of the wounded murdered in the insurgent hospital at 7 Długa Street

The liquidation of the insurgent hospitals in Warsaw's Old Town was the massacre of wounded Warsaw insurgents taken prisoner in the Old Town by the units of Heinz Reinefarth and Oskar Dirlewanger. The massacre took place on 2 September 1944, and its victims included nearly 1,000 wounded prisoners and several thousand civilians (altogether up to 7,000 people). During this time, amid murders, rapes, and looting, the German forces also expelled the surviving civilian population from the Old Town.

== Fall of the Old Town ==
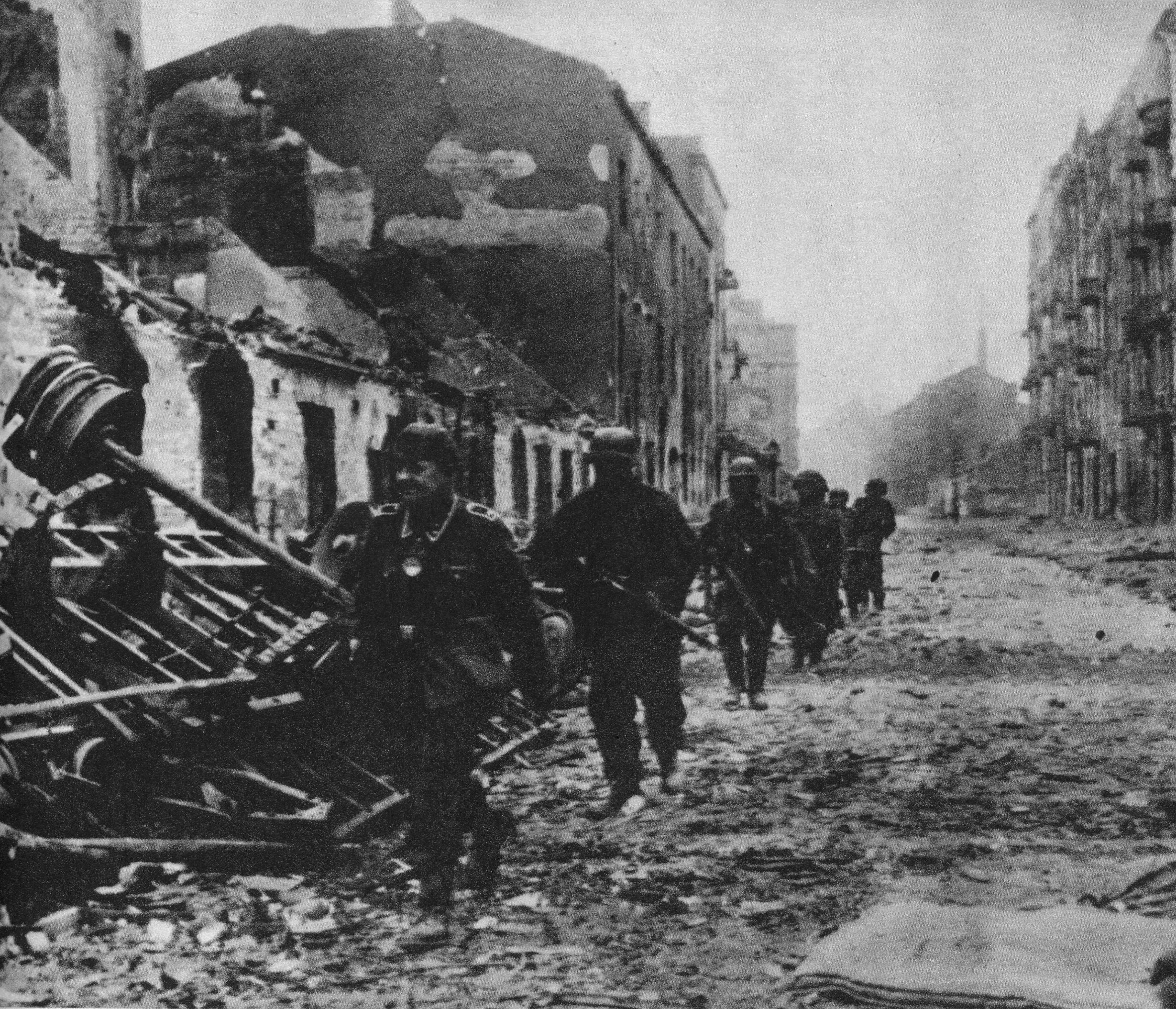
SS unit enters the ruins of the Old Town

On 1 September 1944, the insurgent forces defending the Old Town for two weeks began a general retreat in the evening hours. Over the next several hours, around 4,500 to 5,000 people (mostly Home Army soldiers) passed through the sewers from the Old Town to Śródmieście, while around 800 people, mainly soldiers of the People's Army and the Jewish Combat Organization, evacuated to Żoliborz. At that time, most of the lightly wounded insurgents and some medical personnel left the district.

On 2 September, in the early morning hours, the units of the Reinefarth Combat Group (including troops from the notorious SS-Sonderregiment Dirlewanger, who had previously gained infamy for the massacre in Warsaw's Wola district) cautiously entered the areas of the Old Town abandoned by the insurgents. At 6:00 AM, German planes dropped leaflets in Polish calling on the civilian population to leave the Old Town within two hours, warning that the district would be razed to the ground after the deadline. The advancing Germans engaged in skirmishes in several places with the last insurgent rearguards, made up mainly of soldiers from the Home Army battalions Wigry and Czata 49. As a result, German Junkers Ju 87 planes carried out several air raids on the Old Town quarters that had been abandoned by the insurgents but had not yet been occupied by the Germans.

Meanwhile, around 2,500 severely wounded insurgents (unable to evacuate via the sewers) and some of their medical personnel remained in the Old Town. Antoni Przygoński estimated that about 1,500 of the wounded soldiers were located in hospitals and medical points scattered throughout the district. Most of them were placed in: the central insurgent hospital located in the Raczyński Palace at 7 Długa Street (about 450 wounded), the St. Hyacinth's Church (about 200 wounded), the hospital at 23 Miodowa Street (about 150 wounded), the hospital at 25 Podwale Street located in the basement of the "Krzywa Latarnia" restaurant (about 100 wounded), the hospital of Home Army battalions Wigry and Gustaw at 1/3 Kiliński Street (about 60 wounded), the building of the Warsaw Charity Society at 10 Freta Street (about 60 wounded), and the hospital at 46 Podwale Street located in the cellars of the "Czarny Łabędź" building (about 30 wounded).

The rest of the wounded insurgents, around 1,000, hid among the civilian population or lost their lives during the morning Luftwaffe air raids (including around 300 wounded from the hospital at Świętojerska Street and 50 wounded from the hospital at 23 Miodowa Street). Additionally, about 35,000 civilians remained in the ruins of the Old Town, with around 5,000 wounded.

== Massacre of wounded insurgents ==
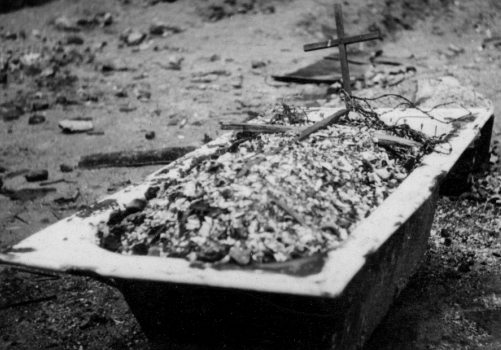
Bathtub filled with ashes discovered on Wąski Dunaj Street

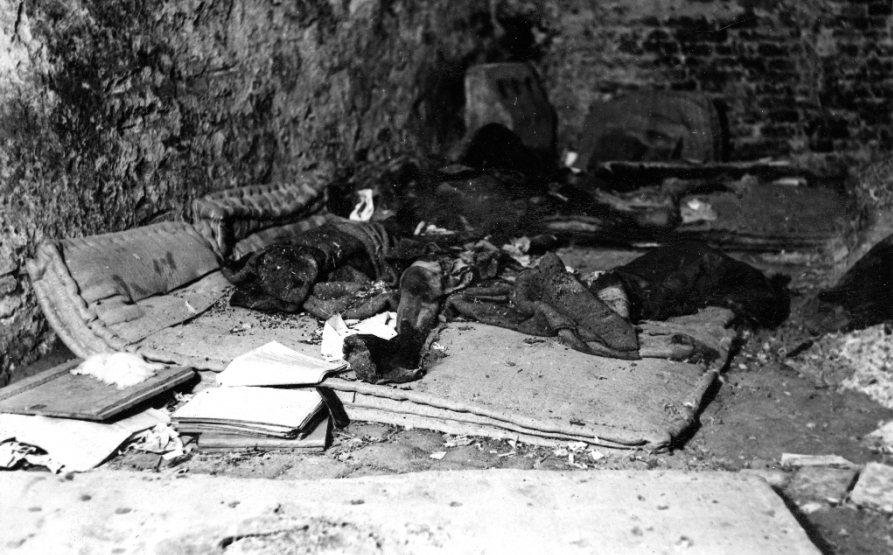
Remains of insurgents murdered in the cellars of the Raczyński Palace (7 Długa Street)

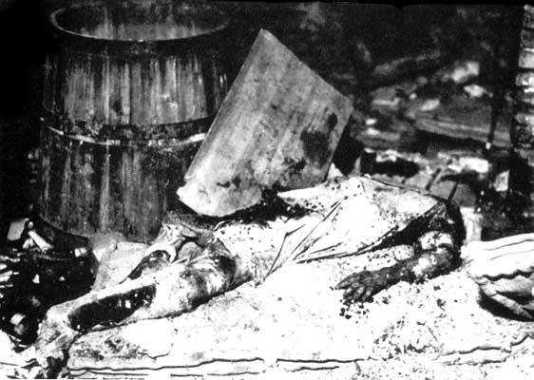
Courtyard of the hospital at 9 Długa Street

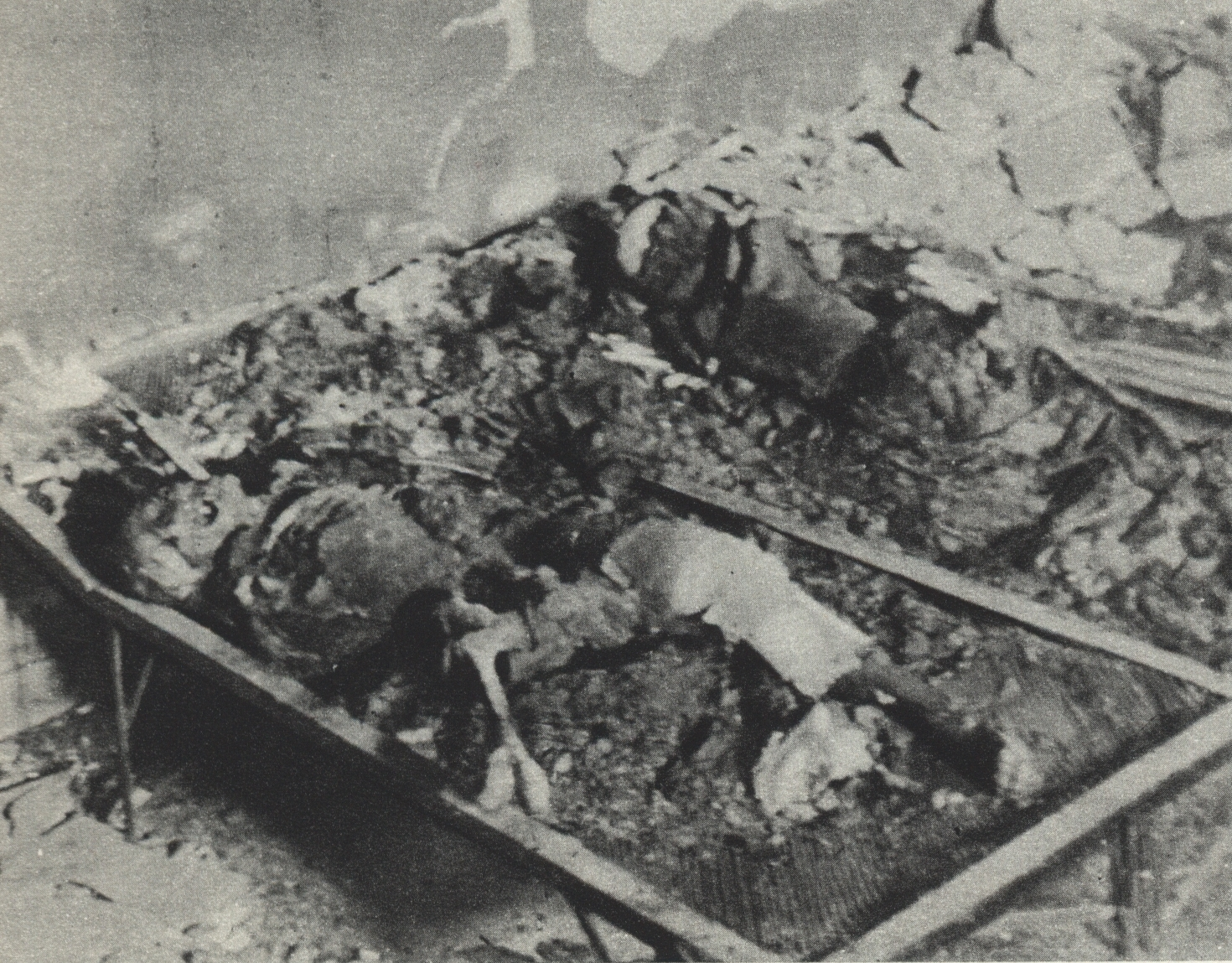
Remains of insurgents murdered in the hospital at 15 Długa Street (corner of Miodowa Street)

Initially, the first German soldiers who entered the insurgent hospitals behaved relatively properly, with some officers even promising to provide food and medical supplies to the wounded. However, the situation drastically changed around 11:00 AM. Historian Antoni Przygoński suggested that a decision to exterminate the wounded had been made in the German command, likely by SS-Gruppenführer Reinefarth, possibly in agreement with the commander of German forces in Warsaw, SS-Obergruppenführer Erich von dem Bach-Zelewski.

The liquidation of insurgent hospitals typically followed a grimly systematic pattern. Germans, along with collaborators from Eastern volunteer units, stormed into hospital wards, ordering medical staff and lightly wounded patients to leave within 5–10 minutes. After the deadline – or sometimes earlier – they set the hospital on fire and began murdering the wounded Poles, often in cruel ways. Many were burned alive, including in hospitals on Podwale Street and at 1/3 Kiliński Street. Medical personnel were also targeted, with insurgent nurses and lightly wounded female patients often subjected to sexual violence.

One witness, sapper Mathias Schenk, recalled:

A nurse stood in the doorway with a small white flag. We entered with fixed bayonets. A huge hall with beds and mattresses on the floor. Everywhere, the wounded. Besides Poles, there were also seriously wounded Germans. They begged us not to kill the Poles (...). But behind us came the Dirlewanger men (...). The SS men shot all the wounded. They smashed their heads with rifle butts. The wounded Germans screamed and cried. Then the Dirlewanger men attacked the nurses, tearing off their clothes. We were driven outside to guard duty. The screams of women could be heard.

Another testimony, from Kamila Merwartowa, recounted:

Germans and Ukrainians stormed the insurgent hospital (...), like cattle, they began to kick and beat the wounded lying on the ground, cursing them as bastards and Polish bandits. (...) They crushed the heads of the poor souls lying on the ground with their boots, roaring horribly, kicking and hitting wherever they could. Blood and brains splattered everywhere.

Lightly wounded patients and surviving staff were usually forced to leave the Old Town along with the civilian population. Few managed to survive. Even during the evacuation, SS officers conducted "selections", attempting to identify insurgents hiding among the crowd. Suspected individuals were often executed on the spot. The largest executions occurred in the so-called inter-wall area (Wąski Dunaj Street), where between 70 and 100 people, mainly wounded insurgents, were shot. Their bodies were burned, and when Warsaw residents returned to the Old Town in January 1945, they discovered a bathtub filled with human ashes on Wąski Dunaj Street. About 55 people were also executed on Castle Square, and several dozen Jews liberated by the insurgents from the Warsaw concentration camp were murdered on Krasiński Square.

Selections and executions also took place in Stawki, Traugutt Park, and Wola, including at the Pfeiffer factory on Okopowa Street and near St. Wojciech Church. These "selections" were not always systematic, as any German soldier could arbitrarily decide that someone in the crowd of refugees was an insurgent and kill them in nearby ruins. Survivors from the hospital at 7 Długa Street recalled that during the "evacuation", the entire stretch of Podwale – from Długa Street to Castle Square – was lined with Germans and collaborators from various formations. Under the slightest pretext, they sought to identify insurgents among the crowd. One incident involved a wounded man being shot simply because the searching German found a coffee bean on him, which "could have come from German food stores".

On 2 September, German forces systematically liquidated insurgent hospitals in Warsaw's Old Town:

- Hospital at 7 Długa Street (Raczyński Palace) – early in the morning, German soldiers seized the hospital, killing three wounded patients on arrival. Shortly after, another group of Germans, behaving relatively properly, allowed patients to eat lunch and promised food and medical supplies. A German officer promised to supply food and medical supplies to the wounded. However, the situation drastically changed around midday when a group of SS troops, led by Hauptsturmführer Kotschke, arrived. He ordered the staff and lightly wounded to leave the building within 10 minutes. The SS then massacred several hundred severely wounded insurgents who were unable to move independently, using grenades and machine guns. Approximately 100 people were gathered in the courtyard of Raczyński Palace, where between 20 and 30 individuals were executed, including the nurse Ninka, who attempted to save her wounded husband. The remaining group was forced to march toward Castle Square, during which many were killed, including four nurses, and others were executed on Wąski Dunaj Street. Out of the entire group, only about 20 people survived due to the intervention of German doctor Dr. Müller. Additionally, some severely wounded patients managed to survive by hiding in the hospital's cellars. In total, approximately 430 patients from the hospital at 7 Długa Street were murdered.
- "Pod Krzywą Latarnią" Hospital (25 Podwale Street) and "Czarny Łabędź" Hospital (46 Podwale Street) – on 2 September, both hospitals housed approximately 130 wounded individuals, along with medical staff. After taking control of "Czarny Łabędź", a drunken German officer killed three wounded patients and attempted to assault a nurse attending to them. A second group of German soldiers arrived shortly afterward, behaving relatively decently, even offering the wounded a glass of vodka each. At "Pod Krzywą Latarnią", the Germans initially confined themselves to robbing the wounded and medical staff. However, after some time, they proceeded to liquidate both hospitals. At "Pod Krzywą Latarnią", fewer than 20 people were allowed to leave the building. At "Czarny Łabędź", only severely wounded individuals remained. The hospitals were subsequently set on fire, causing the wounded inside to burn alive or be shot while attempting to escape the flames. Most of the 20 survivors from "Pod Krzywą Latarnią" were later executed on Wąski Dunaj Street.
- Hospital at 1/3 Kilińskiego Street – one of the first hospitals burned by the Germans on 2 September. Most patients perished in the fire. A few were allowed to be carried out by staff at the request of Father Rostworowski, only to be executed in the courtyard. Total casualties: approximately 50.
- Hospital at St. Hyacinth's Church – around 200 patients were in the hospital when it was liquidated. 80 lightly wounded were allowed to leave, while the building was set ablaze. Severely wounded patients were left exposed outdoors for two days before being moved to the hospital at the Carmelite Church at Krakowskie Przedmieście. During this time, at least a dozen were killed, and nurses suffered widespread sexual violence.
- Hospital at 9 Długa Street – the Germans killed an unknown number of patients, including two young girls with amputated legs. The victims' bodies were burned.
- First aid post at 24 Miodowa Street – personnel and lightly wounded patients were expelled, while 10 severely wounded individuals were killed with grenades. Three nurses who stayed with the wounded went missing.
- Medical post at Hipoteczna Street – 17 wounded insurgents were taken from the cellars and executed in the courtyard.
- Hospital at 10 Freta Street – six severely wounded patients and a nurse were killed. The remaining staff and patients were allowed to leave the Old Town.
- Hospital at 23 Miodowa Street – wounded insurgents were spared by injured German soldiers at the hospital. However, during evacuation to Wola, the Germans executed four staff members – Greek Jews liberated from the camp on Gęsia Street.

Several dozen severely wounded individuals from civilian hospitals on Świętojerska Street and the Capuchin monastery on Miodowa Street were executed on the spot. Numerous wounded insurgents and civilians were also murdered during executions at the Pfeiffer factory in Wola. It was only after two days that Colonel Willi Schmidt, commander of the 608th Security Regiment, permitted assistance to be provided to the surviving wounded insurgents who were still hiding in the ruins of the Old Town.

== Repression of the civilian population ==
Upon occupying the areas of the Old Town abandoned by insurgents, the Germans behaved with merciless cruelty. The basements, where civilians had been hiding, were bombarded with grenades or set on fire with gasoline, while fleeing individuals were shot with machine guns. It was only after some time that the German command ordered the slaughter to cease and instructed the removal of all civilians who were capable of moving on their own from the Old Town. The wounded, ill, elderly, and infirm (as well as captured insurgents) were to be exterminated.

Civilians were brutally expelled from basements and shelters, given only a few minutes to leave. Those who hesitated or resisted were executed on the spot. Houses were then set on fire with those who had not yet managed to escape inside. The civilians were driven out of the Old Town along two routes. The first led through Castle Square, Mariensztat, Bednarska Street, Krakowskie Przedmieście, and Saxon Garden, from where the people were then herded through Chłodna and Wolska streets to St. Wojciech's Church in Wola. The second route passed through Traugutt Park, Konwiktorska, Muranowska, and Zamenhof streets to the warehouses on Stawki, from there to Wola – to the Pfeiffer factory on Okopowa Street and St. Wojciech's Church. The expulsion of the Old Town's residents was accompanied by beatings, harassment, insults, and looting of valuables. German soldiers and collaborators from Eastern volunteer units pulled young women and girls from the crowds, subsequently raping them in the ruins.

Additionally, civilians fell victim to various formal or informal "selections" conducted at Castle Square, Stawki, Traugutt Park, the Pfeiffer factory, and St. Wojciech's Church in Wola. The wounded, ill, elderly, disabled, those suspected of participating in the uprising, or people who had incurred the wrath of the escorting soldiers were dragged from the crowd and murdered. In total, after the fall of the Old Town, the Germans killed at least 3,000 people, including nearly 1,000 wounded insurgents. Some reports suggest that the number of victims may have reached 5,000–7,000.

The surviving residents of the Old Town were directed to Dulag 121 camp in Pruszków. In the first days of September, nearly 75,000 refugees from various districts of Warsaw were sent to the Pruszków camp, leading to one of the highest densities in its history. From Pruszków, most of the Old Town residents were eventually deported to German concentration camps. As early as the end of August 1944, SS-Obergruppenführer Ernst Kaltenbrunner, head of the Reich Security Main Office, instructed the command of the Army Group Centre to send the majority of able-bodied men and women from Warsaw to work in concentration camps, citing "serious police security considerations". Only women with small children could be considered for civil labor and assigned to the Head Commissioner for Mobilization of Labor Forces, Fritz Sauckel.

== Bibliography ==
- Borkiewicz, Adam (1969). Powstanie warszawskie. Zarys działań natury wojskowej [The Warsaw Uprising. Outline of Military Operations] (in Polish). Warsaw: Pax.
- Datner, Szymon; Leszczyński, Kazimierz, eds. (1962). Zbrodnie okupanta w czasie powstania warszawskiego w 1944 roku (w dokumentach) [Crimes of the Occupier During the Warsaw Uprising in 1944 (in Documents)] (in Polish). Warsaw: MON.
- Motyl, Maja; Rutkowski, Stanisław (1994). Powstanie Warszawskie – rejestr miejsc i faktów zbrodni [The Warsaw Uprising – Register of Locations and Facts of Crimes] (in Polish). Warsaw: Institute of National Remembrance.
- Przygoński, Antoni (1980). Powstanie warszawskie w sierpniu 1944 r. [The Warsaw Uprising in August 1944] (in Polish). Warsaw: PWN. ISBN 83-01-00293-X.
