= Zygmunt Vetulani (diplomat) =

Polish diplomat and economist (1894–1942)

Zygmunt Michał Vetulani
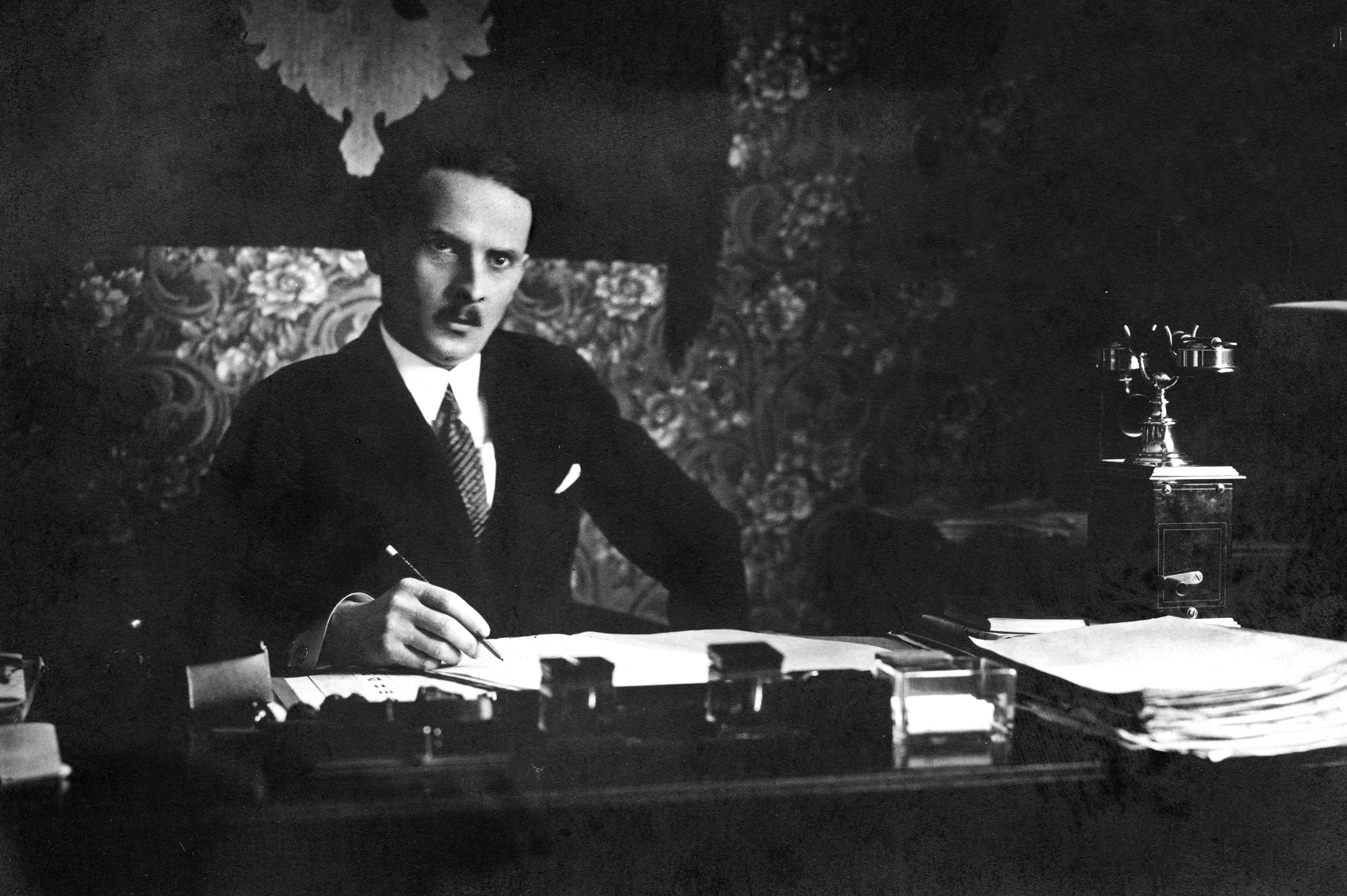
- Born: 1894; Sanok
- Died: 1942 (aged 47–48); Rio de Janeiro
- Citizenship: Polish
- Occupations: Diplomat; Economist

Zygmunt Michał Vetulani (1894–1942) was a Polish diplomat and economist. He was a general consul of Rzeczpospolita in Kaliningrad, Baghdad and Rio de Janeiro.

== Biography ==
He was the oldest son of Roman Vetulani and Elżbieta Kunachowicz. His brothers were Kazimierz, Tadeusz and Adam. He also had two sisters: Maria and Elżbieta. In 1912 he graduated Queen Sophia high school in Sanok.

He was married to Stanisława Leśniewska. They had a daughter, Wanda.

== Family tree ==
Vetulani family

* the list is incomplete

Michał Vetulani	Franciszka (née Śliwińska)
Jan	Matylda (née Pisz)	Roman	Elżbieta (née Kunachowicz)	Franciszek; Latinik	Franciszek	Katarzyna (née Ipohorska)
Eugeniusz	Kazimierz	Zygmunt	Tadeusz	Maria (née Godlewska)	Adam	Irena (née Latinik)	Zofia	Bohdan de Nisau	Maria	Cecylia
Armand	Wanda	Zygmunt	Grażyna (née Świerczyńska)	Krystyna	Jerzy	Maria (née Pająk)	Witold
Agnieszka	Maria	Charles	Tomasz
