= Armand Vetulani =

Polish art historian, critic, curator, and lecturer (1909–1994)

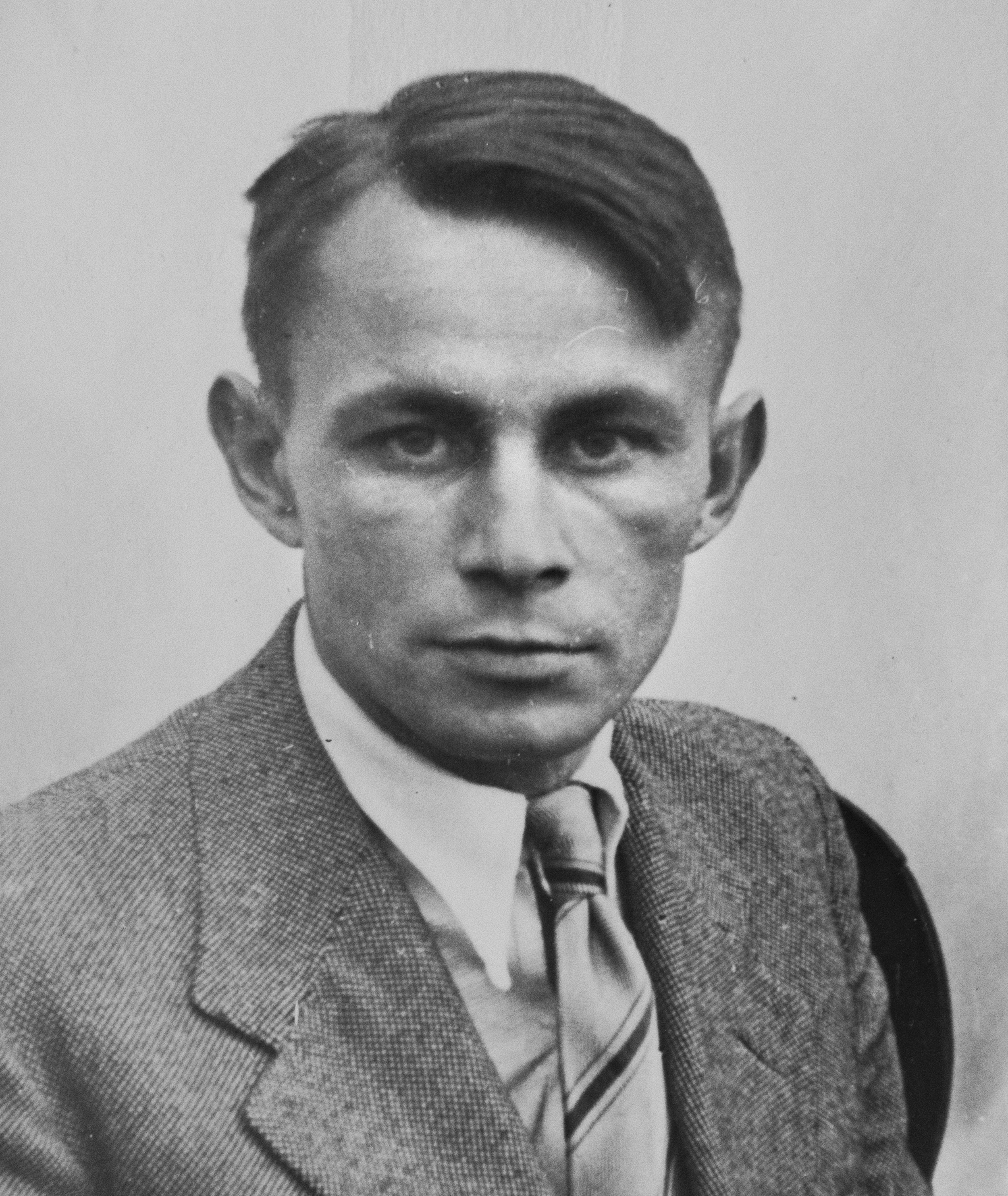
- Vetulani in the 1930s.
- Born: 16 December 1909
- Died: 3 April 1994 (aged 84); Warszawa
- Citizenship: Polish
- Occupation: art historian

Armand Vetulani (16 December 1909 – 3 April 1994) was a Polish art historian, art critic and educator, first postwar director of the Central Bureau for Art Exhibitions.

== Life ==
Armand Vetulani was the son of Eugeniusz Vetulani, brother of Zbigniew and Eugeniusz "Gajga" (an Auschwitz prisoner). During the German occupation of Poland he was an underground educator, which was constantly threatened by the death penalty. Joanna Kulmowa remembered him from that period as a "wonderful teacher". In her 1971 novel Trzy (Three) Kulmowa introduced a character called Dorian whose prototype was Vetulani.

During the interbellum Vetulani worked in Warsaw at the Fine Arts Section of the Ministry of Religious Denominations and Public Education (photo below).

After the war he was artistic director at a Milanówek silk factory. From 1949 he was director of the Zachęta (Central Bureau for Art Exhibitions), newly reopened, the central national art institution in Warsaw. In 1954 he was stripped of his office after refusing to join the Polish United Workers' Party, according to Vetulani's long-time collaborator and friend, Bożena Kowalska. In 1952 he received Gold Cross of Merit.

Since 1953 he taught at the State Visual Arts Gathering in Grodzisk Mazowiecki, an institution led by a painter Edward Kokoszko. Since 1954 until 1955 he was a Head of Documentation of Contemporary Visual Arts Department at The Institute of Art of the Polish Academy of Sciences.

A very short man, with a leg defect and with very big hands. He was strong, before World War II he was a champion in swimming. He was extremely clever and charming.

— Art critic, friend and collaborator Bożena Kowalska on Armand Vetulani

He authored several works in art history, including a 1952 monograph on Wojciech Gerson and a chapter on realistic painting in A History of Polish Art (Dzieje sztuki polskiej, 1984), edited by Bożena Kowalska.

For many years he remained single. In his later years he married his long-time friend and secretary Barbara. They had no children.

== Awards ==
- Gold Cross of Merit (1952)
- Medal of the 10th Anniversary of the People's Republic of Poland (1955)
- Officer's Cross of the Order of Polonia Restituta
- Medal of Merit for National Defence
- Meritorious Activist of Culture

== Gallery ==
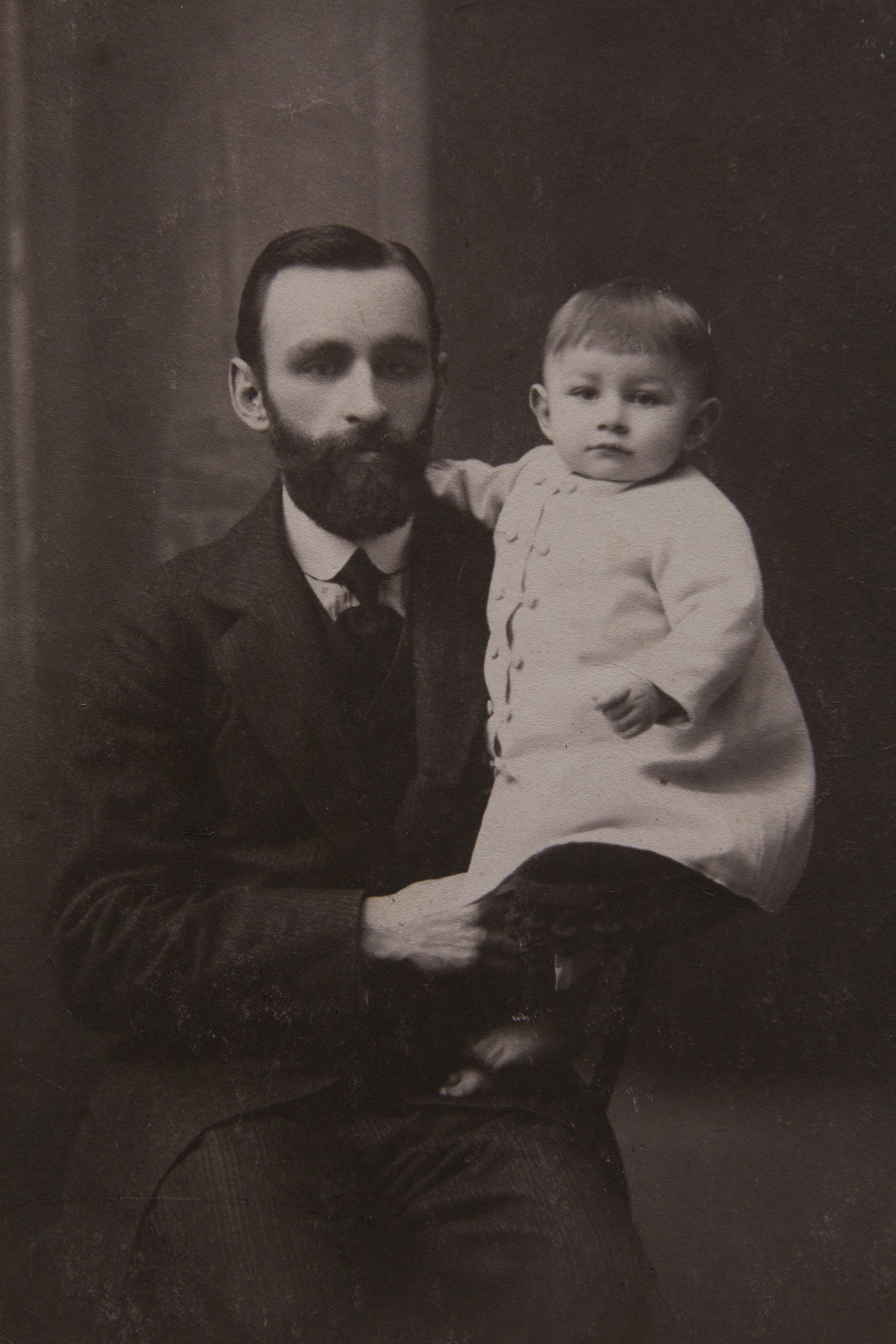
Armand Vetulani and his father Eugeniusz, c. 1912.

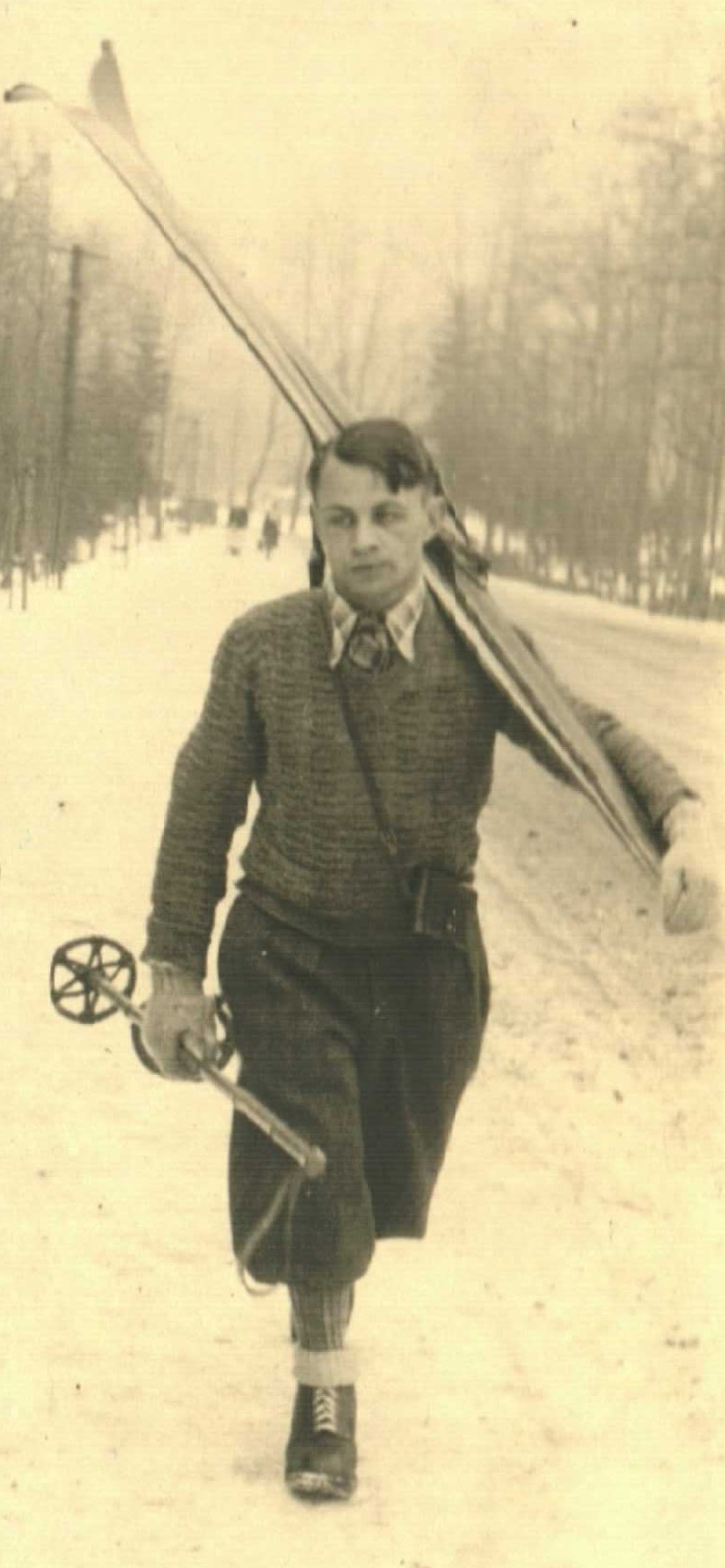
Armand Vetulani with skis, 1930 or later.

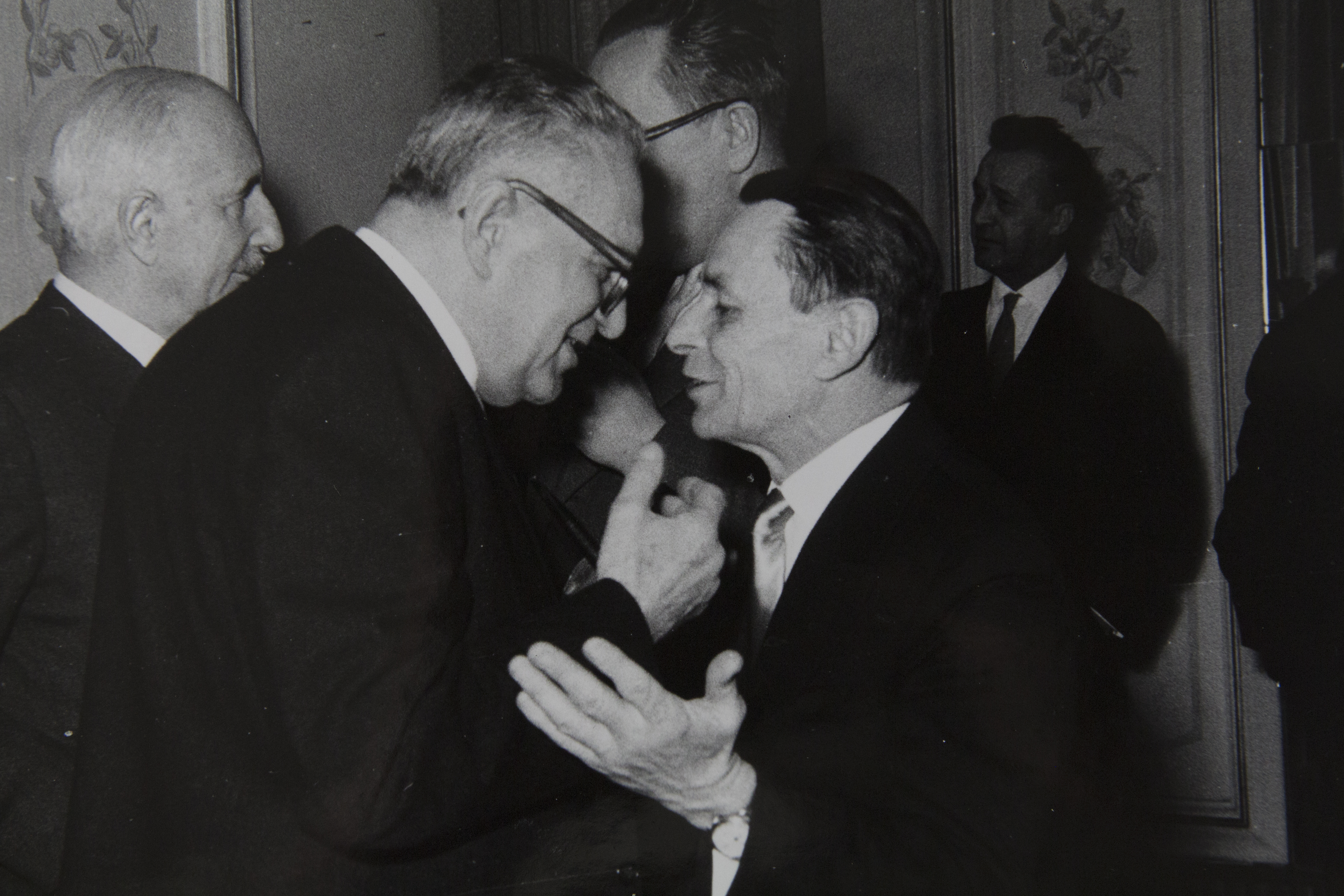
Armand Vetulani and Bohdan Marconi, 1960 or later.

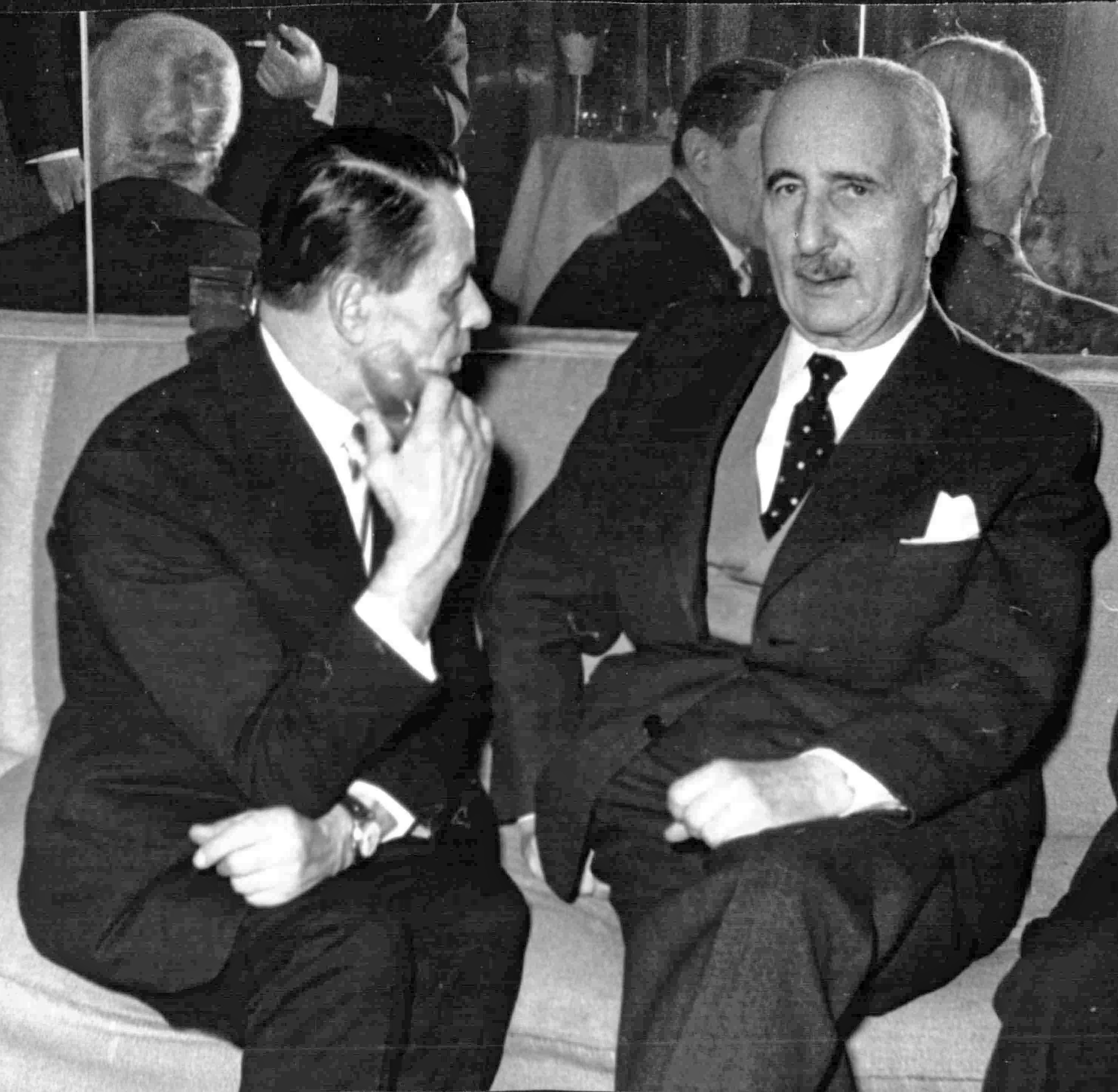
Armand Vetulani and Władysław Tatarkiewicz, 1960 or later.

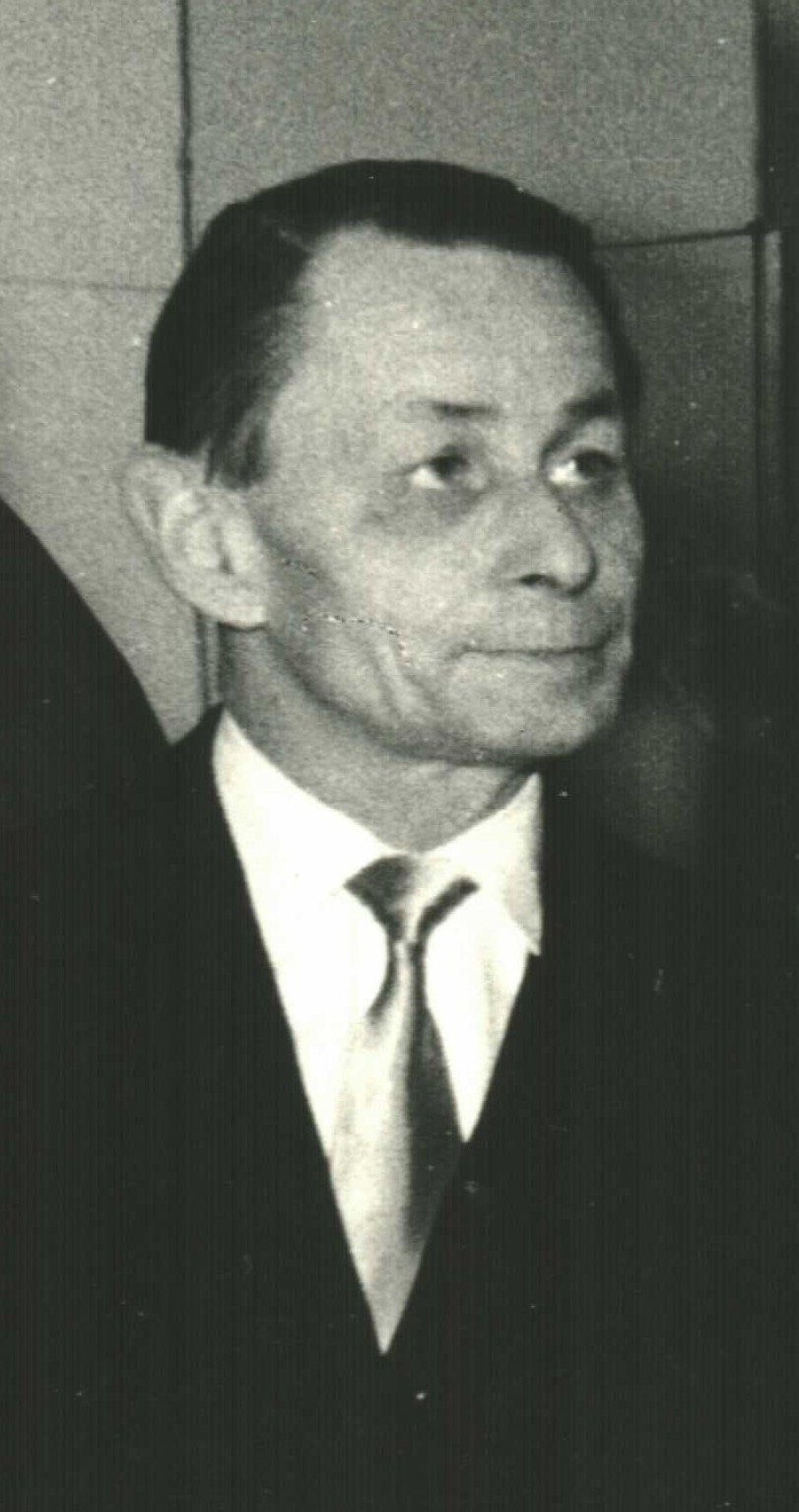
Armand Vetulani and Władysław Tatarkiewicz, 1960 or later.

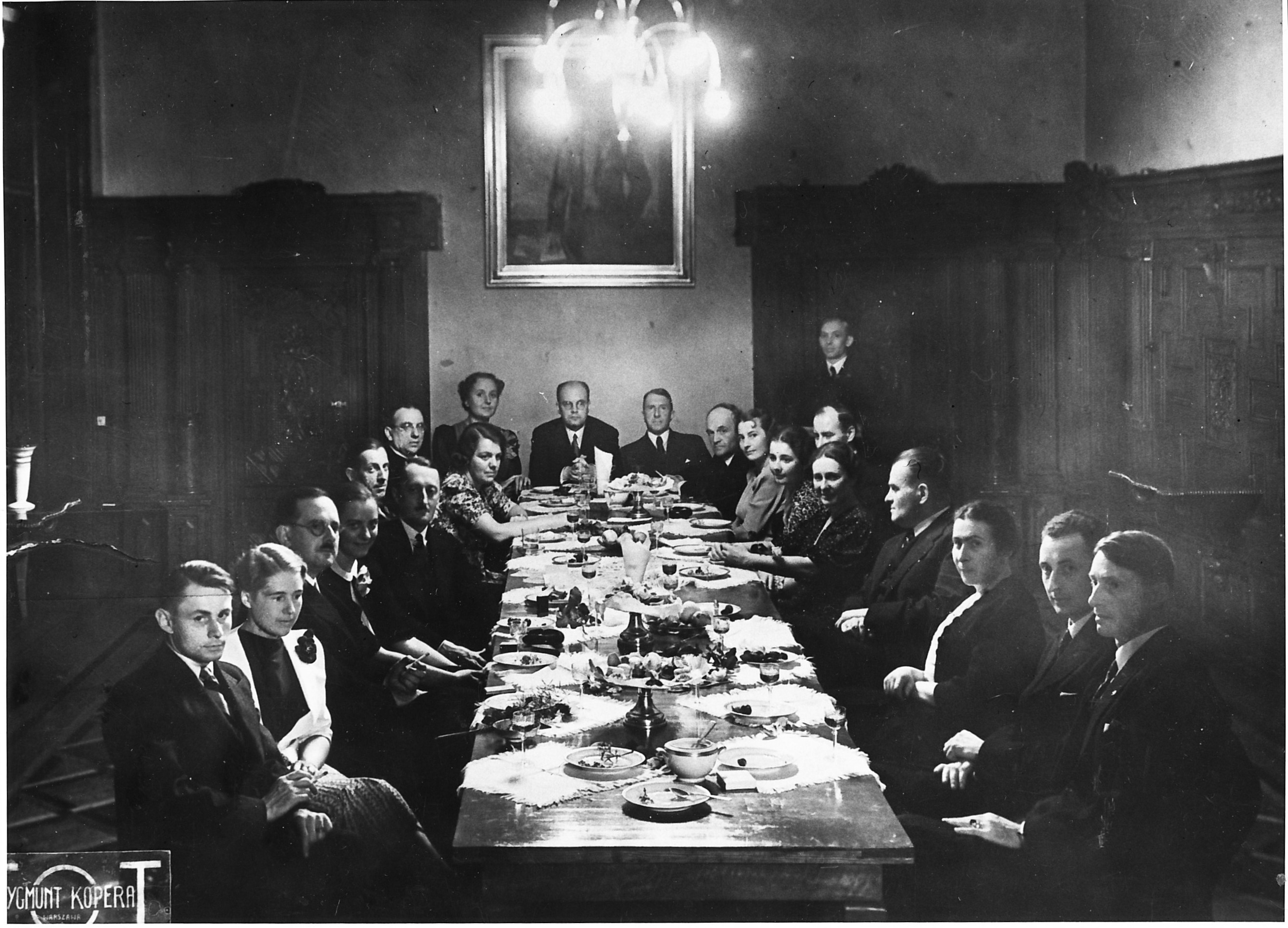
Assembly of Fine Arts Section of Ministry of Religious Denominations and Public Education, Warsaw, Poland, 1938. Armand Vetulani (1st on the left), Jerzy Szablowski (3rd on the left), Maciej Masłowski (5th on the left).

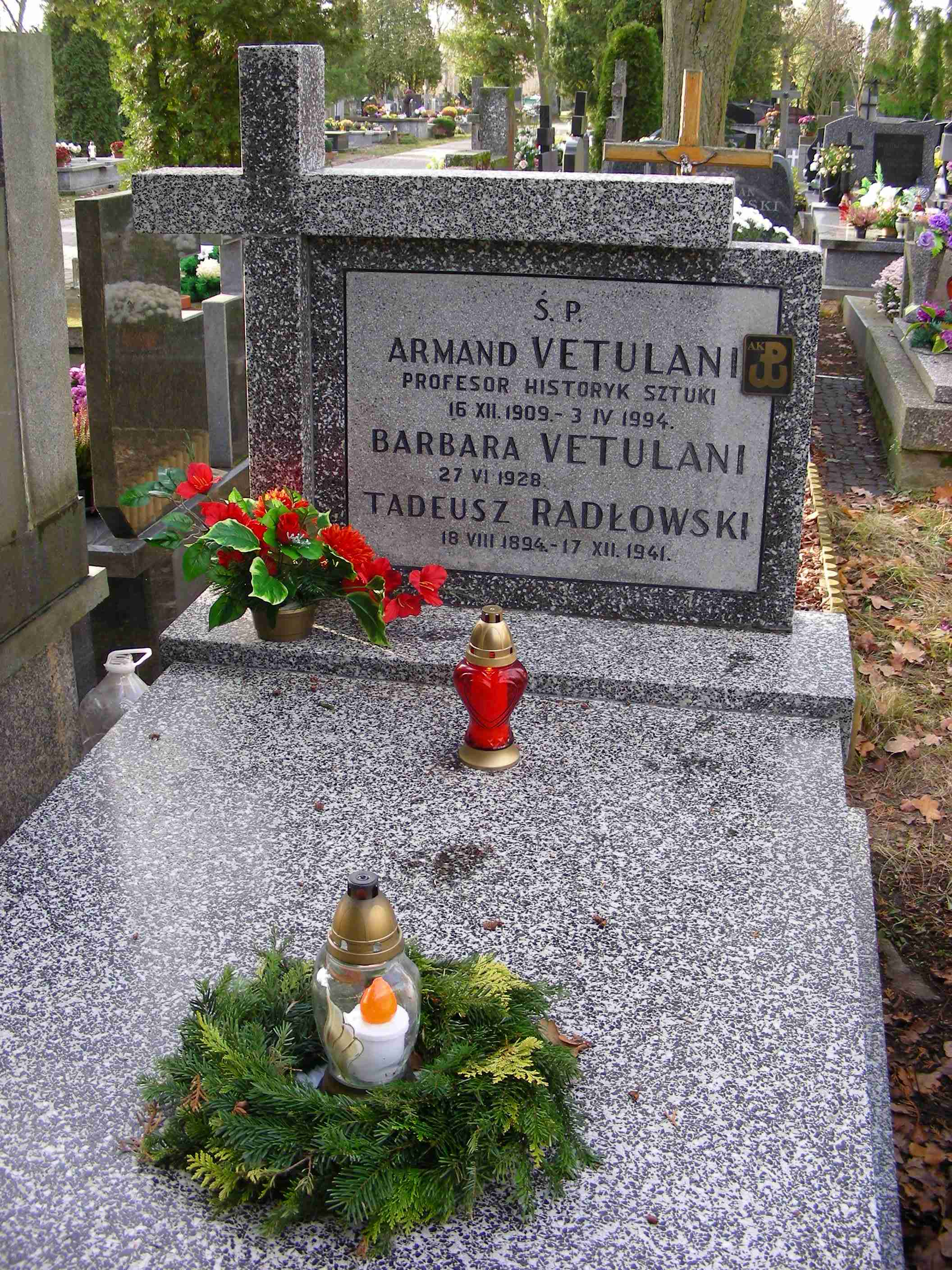
Armand Vetulani's family grave at the Milanówek cemetery.

== See also ==
- List of Poles
