= Galeria Olympia =

Gallery for contemporary art in Kraków established in 1999

Coordinates: 50.0706°N 19.9344°E

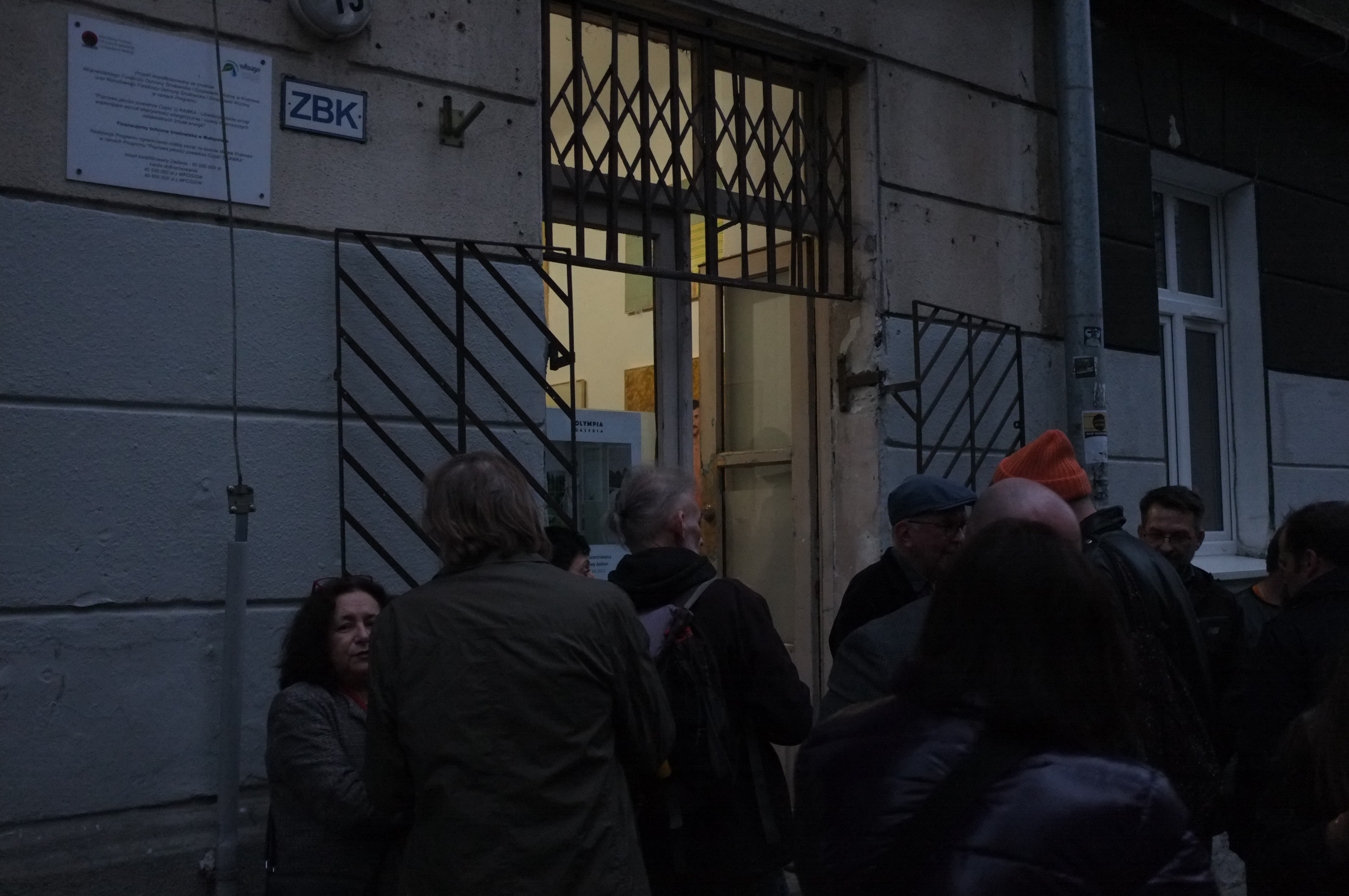
- Exhibition opening at the gallery, 2023
- Location: Kraków
- Type: art gallery
- Founder: Olimpia Maciejewska
- program director: Olimpia Maciejewska
- Website: olympiagaleria.eu

Galeria Olympia is an art gallery in Cracow, Poland established in 1999, that shows works by contemporary artists. Its name refers to the name of the founder, Olimpia Maciejewska, and to the title of a 1863 painting by Edouard Manet. The gallery is located at Limanowskiego 24/4b in Kraków.

== Activity ==
Galeria Olympia was established on 4 June 1999. It was located at Koletek Street until 2001, then it was moved several times. Since 2013 it ran in the Podgórze district, at Limanowskiego Street 24/4b. In 2022 the gallery moved to the new address, Szlak 13 Street. In 2025, the gallery returned to Limanowskiego 24/4b.

The gallery is run by Fred Gijbels Foundation. Each year it organises various solo exhibitions and at least one group exhibition focusing on a given issue. It held events that were part of Krakow Photomonth and Conrad Festival (exhibition The Great Forties). Exhibitions previews were a regular contribution to Gadający Pies magazine.

== Artists ==
Artists shown at the gallery include:

- Bogusław Bachorczyk
- Ireneusz Bęc
- Ewa Ciepielewska
- Wojciech Ćwiertniewicz
- Edward Fella
- Raffaella Gentile
- Adam Golec
- Michał Iwański
- Katarzyna Kmita
- Magdalena Kościsz
- Bogumił Książek
- Władysław Markowski
- Robert Motelski
- Andrzej Pilichowski-Ragno
- Dominik Podsiadły
- Adam Rzepecki
- Łódź Kaliska group
- Tomasz Vetulani
- Piotr Wachowski
