= Maria Pinińska-Bereś =

Polish feminist artist

Maria Pinińska-Bereś (born 17 August 1931 in Poznań, died 20 April 1999 in Kraków) – was a Polish sculptor and performance artist, creator of installation and environment art. She was part of the artistic community in Kraków, where she lived and worked. Maria Pinińska-Bereś is recognized among pioneers of feminist art.

== Biography ==
After graduating from the Art High School in Katowice, she began her studies at the Academy of Fine Arts in Kraków in 1950. She studied sculpture, initially under Jerzy Bandura, and then in the studio of Xawery Dunikowski. In 1956, she obtained her diploma and remained in Kraków, where she spent the rest of her life.

In the same year, she married Jerzy Bereś, a sculptor and performance artist. The couple had one child, a daughter named Bettina Bereś, who also became an artist.

The apartment she shared with her family was her studio as well a meeting place for artists, critics, and intellectuals. Maria Pinińska-Bereś led an active professional life, participating in numerous artistic events and engaging in creative circles.

In 1962, together with Jerzy Beres, she initiated the annual Sculpture of the Year exhibition and competition, which took place regularly for almost 20 years. From 1979, she was a member of the Kraków Group. Despite the difficulties of being an artist in communist Poland, including censorship and lack of freedom of expression, she consistently pursued her life and career path.

She died on December 17, 1999, and was buried at the Batowice Cemetery in Kraków (plot XI-3-19). Her legacy is cultivated by the Maria Pinińska-Bereś and Jerzy Bereś Foundation, which archives and promotes the work of both artists.

== Style and work ==
Maria Pinińska-Bereś's work evolved over the years, moving from classical figurative sculptures to original installation, performance, and conceptual forms. Her early works from the 1950s revealed elements of an individual style that she developed over the decades, consistently building her own artistic language.

In her early career, she worked with stone and bronze to create traditional style sculptures, but she began to move away from heavy, classical materials in favor of lightweight and impermanent ones. Starting from 1960s she began using papier-mâché, and later textiles stuffed with soft material, which gave her sculptures an organic, flesh-like feeling. Simultaneously she started working with color. Pastels, especially pinks and violets, played a major role in her creative works, symbolizing femininity. Pink, which soon dominated her creations, was used ironically, as well as affirmatively. It served as a tool criticizing social roles and gender stereotypes.

In 1960s Pinińska-Bereś became involved with a circle of artists associated with Tadeusz Kantor. She participated, among others, in the Panoramic Sea Happening in Osieki in 1967, which sparked her interest in performance art. In the following decade, she started realizing her own artistic performances, often in intimate settings, such as outdoors or private properties. They were aimed at a niche audience, documented only through film or photography. In her performances she often referenced nature, bodies and everyday life.

Pinińska-Bereś's work stood out for its feminist approach, unheard of in Poland at that time. She consistently addressed social and personal topics, often referencing feminine gender norms in patriarchal society. However, "Pinińska-Bereś was not a feminist in the strict sense. She was concerned with feminist issues, but did not adopt the label and emphasized the female over the -ism." In 1995, Pinińska-Bereś stated: "I consider the year 1965 as the date when my art begins, art that may be labelled as female." Two years later, she stressed that "my first contacts with European feminists brought disappointment. They treated art too instrumentally. And I felt as an artist first of all." Thus, she stressed her "conviction in art's superiority."

In 1980s and 1990s she created a series of distinctive spatial installations, often referred to as environments, in which she continued to address femininity, spirituality, physicality, and the relationship with nature. She was also actively involved in Kraków's artistic life, organizing and curating the Sculpture of the Year and Kraków Meetings reviews, supporting the development of the creative community and promoting new phenomena in contemporary art.

Maria Pinińska-Bereś left behind both sculptures and ephemeral works, which are part of the history of avant-garde and feminist art in Poland. Her works are displayed in many museums including the National Museum in Kraków, Wrocław, Poznań, Warsaw, the Silesian Museum in Katowice, the Center of Polish Sculpture in Orońsko, and the Museum in Bochum.

== Exhibitions ==
=== Solo exhibitions ===
- 1958: Sculpture Exhibition (together with Jerzy Bereś and Tadeusz Szpunar), Dom Plastyków, Kraków.
- 1970: Piwnica pod Baranami, Kraków.
- 1973: Galeria Współczesna, Warsaw.
- 1976: Labyrinth Gallery, Lublin.
- 1980: Galeria Rytm, Kraków; Galeria Krzysztofory, Kraków.
- 1982: BWA, Lublin.
- 1988: Galeria Krzysztofory, Kraków; Gallery 72, District Museum, Chełm.
- 1990: Galeria Krzysztofory, Kraków.
- 1991: BWA, Koszalin, STU Theatre, Kraków.
- 1992: Galeria Starmach, Kraków; BWA, Sandomierz; BWA – Pomeranian Dukes' Castle, Szczecin.
- 1993: Centre of Polish Sculpture in Orońsko.
- 1995: Exhibition as part of the 6th International Drawing Triennial, Galeria BWA Awangarda, Wrocław.
- 1996: Galeria Manhattan, Łódź.
- 1997: Egzystencjarium, Galeria Studio, Warsaw.
- 1999/2000: Maria Pinińska-Bereś, retrospective exhibition, "Bunkier Sztuki" Gallery of Contemporary Art, Kraków; Galeria Bielska BWA, Bielsko-Biała; Arsenał Municipal Gallery, Poznań.
- 2001: Maria Pinińska-Bereś, retrospective exhibition, Baltic Gallery of Contemporary Art in Słupsk.
- 2007: Maria Pinińska-Bereś, Mobile-Immobile, Records of Maria Pinińska-Bereś's Performances, "Bunkier Sztuki" Gallery of Contemporary Art, Kraków.
- 2011: Maria Pinińska-Bereś, Piekary Gallery, Poznań.
- 2012: Maria Pinińska-Bereś, Imaginarium of Corporeality, State Gallery of Art in Sopot, Sopot.
- 2014: Maria Pinińska-Bereś and Jerzy Bereś, Galeria Monopol, Warsaw.
- 2017: Maria Pinińska-Bereś, Trace of a Woman, BWA Gallery of Art in Olsztyn, Olsztyn.
- 2017: Maria Pinińska-Bereś, The Performer, Galeria Monopol, Warsaw.
- 2020: Maria Pinińska-Bereś, Female Reservoir, ASP Gallery, Jan Matejko Academy of Fine Arts in Kraków, Kraków.
- 2020: Maria Pinińska-Bereś, Soap Bubbles, retrospective exhibition, Gallery of Contemporary Art in Opole, Opole.
- 2022: Maria Pinińska-Bereś, Meadow of Your Body, Galerie nächst St. Stephan, Vienna, Austria.
- 2024: Maria Pinińska-Bereś, retrospective exhibition, National Museum in Wrocław, Museum of Contemporary Art – Four Domes Pavilion, Wrocław.
- 2024: Maria Pinińska-Bereś, Galerie für Zeitgenössische Kunst Leipzig, Leipzig.
- 2026: Maria Pinińska-Bereś, Under the pink flag, Kunstmuseum Luzern.

=== Group exhibitions (selected) ===
- 1955: National Exhibition of Young Visual Art "Against War – Against Fascism", Arsenał, Warsaw; Xawery Dunikowski and his students, Zachęta – National Gallery of Art, Warsaw.
- 1957: Exhibition of Young Visual Art, Oslo, Bergen, Narvik.
- 1964: 20 Years of the People's Republic of Poland in Visual Art, Palace of Art, Kraków.
- 1971: 3rd National Sculpture Exhibition, Zachęta – National Gallery of Art, Warsaw.
- 1973: The Connoisseur in Poland. Cracow Art Festival, BWA, Kraków.
- 1974: Kraków Painting and Sculpture on the 30th Anniversary of the People's Republic of Poland, BWA, Palace of Art; Open-Air Sculpture in the Planty Park, Kraków; The Artist in the Face of Civilization, CONTART 74, Studio Gallery, Warsaw.
- 1975: Ten Artists Present New and Latest Works (AICA), National Museum, Poznań; Xawery Dunikowski and His Students. Exhibition on the Centenary of Xawery Dunikowski's Birth, Xawery Dunikowski Museum, Warsaw.
- 1976: Sculpture of the Year 1975 of Southern Poland, BWA, Kraków; FORMAT: HUMAN, STU Gallery, Kraków.
- 1977: 14th Open-Air Sculpture Biennial, Middelheim (Belgium).
- 1979: Exhibition of Krakow Visual Art, Darmstadt; Erotica: Painting, Graphics, Drawing, Sculpture, Dom Artysty Plastyka, Warsaw; 8 X Kraków, Studio Gallery, Warsaw; Feministische Kunst International, Kunstmuseum Den Haag, The Hague (Netherlands).
- 1980: Women's Art, ON Gallery, Poznań; 16th Exhibition of the Kraków Group, Galeria Krzysztofory, Kraków.
- 1981: 11th Sculptors' Meetings, BWA Kraków.
- 1982: K 18 Stoffwechsel, international exhibition, Kassel.
- 1983: 17th International Biennial, São Paulo (Brazil).
- 1984: The Intellectual Current in Polish Art after the Second World War; Polish Performances, BWA, Lublin.
- 1986: Record 2, Labyrinth Gallery, Lublin.
- 1988: The Presentation of Labyrinth Gallery, 1974–1988, Centre of Arts Tapes, The Alexandra Centre – Halifax; Centre en art actuel Le Lieu – Quebec, Canada.
- 1989: Labirynt 2. Labyrinth Gallery Presents, New Space Gallery, Fulda.
- 1990: What Is an Artist to Do in a Time of Distress? Independent Art of the 1980s, Zachęta – National Gallery of Art, Warsaw; National Museum in Kraków.
- 1991: Polish Women Artists, National Museum, Warsaw; Voices of Freedom, The National Museum of Women in the Arts, Washington, D.C. (USA).
- 1992: Nature of Nature, BWA, Lublin; Krakow Group. Works from 1957–1992, The Palace of Fine Arts in Kraków, Kraków.
- 1993: Elements, State Gallery of Art, Łódź; Gallery of the House of the Visual Artist, Warsaw; Artists from Krakow, Zachęta – National Gallery of Art, Warsaw.
- 1994: Hautevolee, Rähnitzgasse Gallery, Dresden (Germany); Ars Erotica, National Museum, Warsaw; Krakow Group 1932–1994, Zachęta – National Gallery of Art, Warsaw; Classics of Contemporaneity, National Museum, Warsaw.
- 1995: Poznań Feminist Seminar. Artistic Presentations, Galeria Fractale, Poznań.
- 1996: Art in Poland: New Directions, University at Buffalo Art Gallery (USA); Impact. Avant-Garde Cracovienne après 1945, Polish Institute in Paris (France); Kobieta o kobiecie, Galeria Bielska BWA, Bielsko-Biała.
- 1998: Shine, Galeria Sztuki Współczesnej Domu Krakowskiego, Nuremberg, Polish Cultural Institute (Germany); Pieds sur Terre, Musée d'Histoire Vivante, Montreuil (Canada); Perz – Rhizom, Galeria Pryzmat, Kraków.
