= Bogusław Bachorczyk =

Polish painter (born 1969)

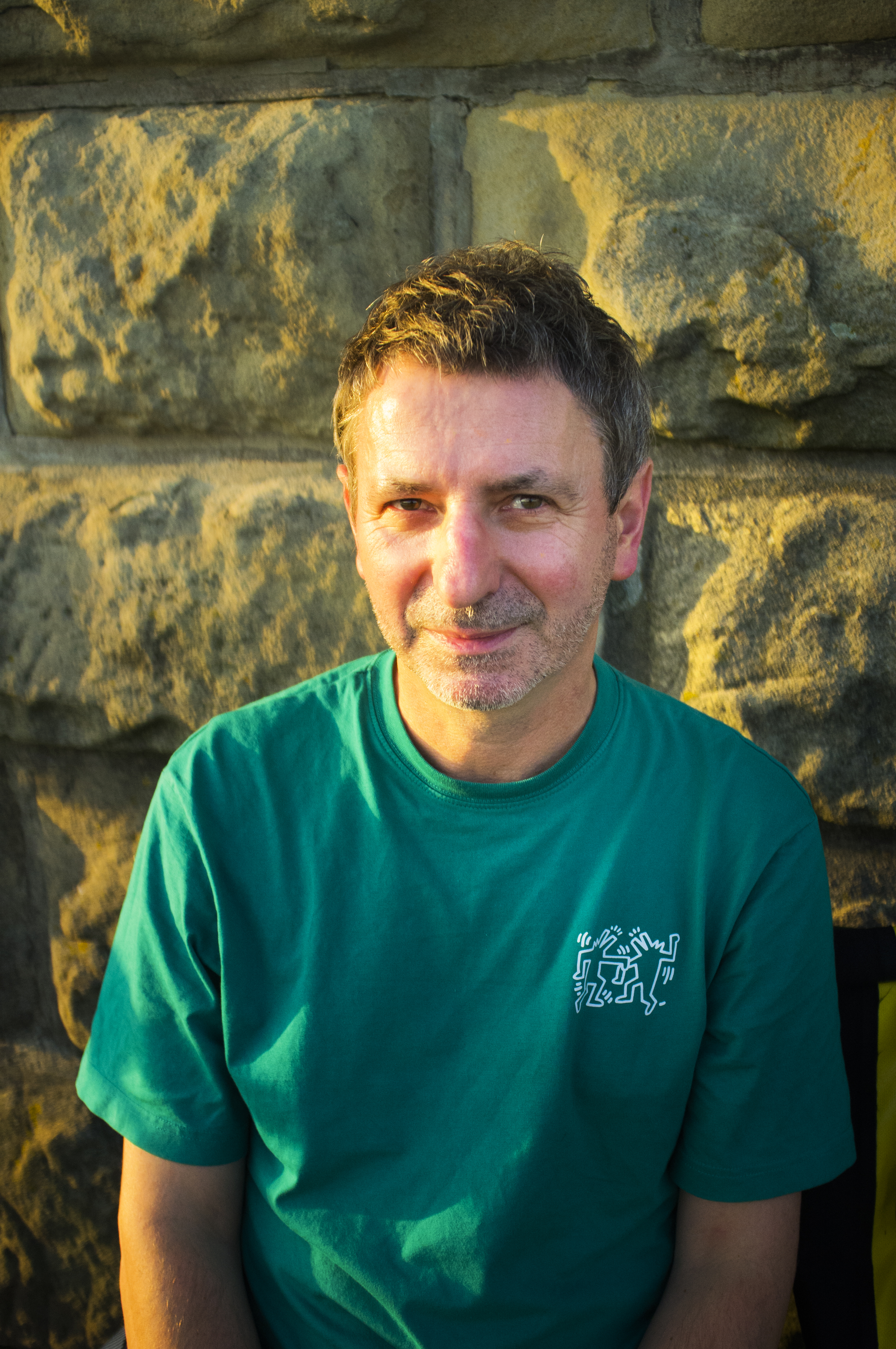
- Bogusław Bachorczyk, 2021
- Born: March 12, 1969 (age 57); Sucha Beskidzka
- Citizenship: Polish
- Education: Jan Matejko Academy of Fine Arts
- Known for: painting, drawing, sculpture
- Website: bachorczyk.com

Bogusław Bachorczyk (born 12 March 1969) is a Polish painter, draftsman and sculptor.

== Biography ==
Born in Sucha Beskidzka, in 1989 he graduated from the Antoni Kenar High School of Fine Arts in Zakopane, where he attended the sculpture class. Then, between 1993 and 1998 he studied painting at the Academy of Fine Arts in Kraków. He graduated from the atelier of Włodzimierz Kunz.

Since 2002, he has been working as a lecturer at the Painting Department of the Jan Matejko Academy of Fine Arts in Kraków, where he has been running the III Interdisciplinary Studio since 2018. In 2011 he obtained P.hD. in fine arts, and in 2014 he obtained habilitation. Among his students was Michał Iwański.

In his work, he mixed various media: painting, sculpture and photography. He used bricolage and combined craft techniques with modern media. His works were sometimes presented in the form of installations with elements of performance art.

In his work, Bogusław Bachorczyk deals with topics of history, identity, forms of remembrance and individual discovery of the private past. He touched on threads related to contemporary definitions of masculinity, male sexuality, and homosexual love. He took up the legacy of artists such as Jarosław Iwaszkiewicz, W.G. Sebald, Wojciech Has, Alexander Rodchenko, Vaslav Nijinsky and Władysław Hasior.

He created concepts and performed a number of creative projects, including a sketchbook diary kept since 1986. An important element of his activity since 2003 is the studio located in Kraków at Czysta Street 17, which is a constantly transformed space for creative exploration.

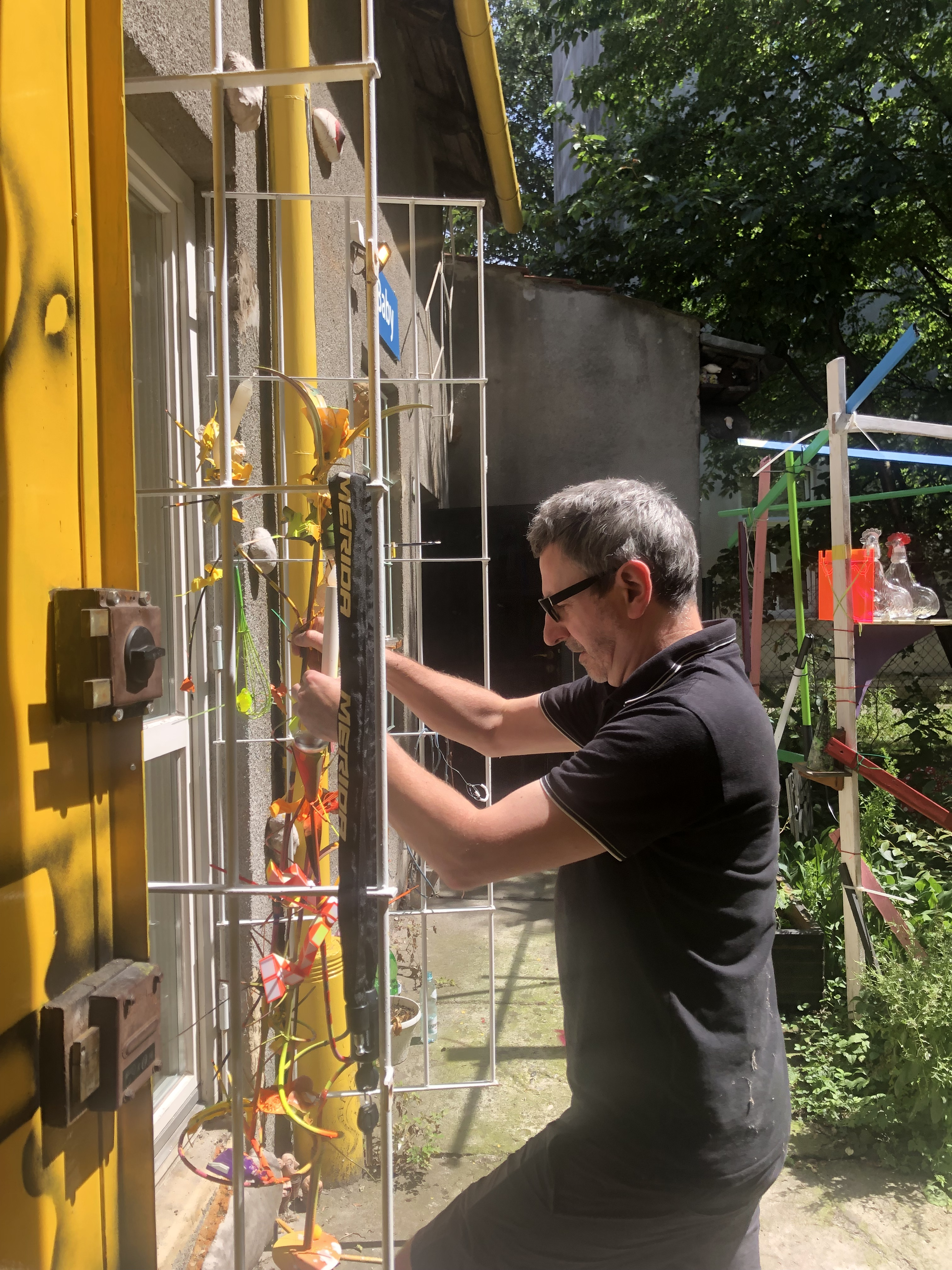
Bogusław Bachorczyk in a garden next to his workshop in Kraków, 2022

Bogusław Bachorczyk invited artists from other fields to collaborate on his projects, including actors, dancers, and poets. He collaborated as an illustrator with several writers. He designed the covers of poetry volumes of Michał Sobol Pulsary (2013) and Schrony (2016), and the cover of the novel of Liliana Hermetz Alicyjka (2014), to which he also made illustrations.

His works have been presented at over fifty individual and group exhibitions, including in National Museum in Kraków, Bunkier Sztuki Gallery, National Museum in Warsaw, Museum of Photography in Kraków, Galeria Zderzak and Galeria Olympia in Kraków, Galeria Atak in Warsaw, ABC Gallery in Poznań, ASP Gallery in Gdańsk, Galeria Labirynt in Lublin, Baltic Gallery of Contemporary Art in Słupsk, the Tatra Museum in Zakopane and the Centre of Polish Sculpture in Orońsko; and also at a number of cultural events, including the Conrad Festival, Photomonth in Kraków, Warsaw Gallery Weekend and the magazine Talking Dog. He published several art books. His works are in a number of private and public collections, including in the Krzysztof Musiał collection.

He was a scholarship holder of the City of Nuremberg, a laureate of the Józef Czapski scholarship. In 2019, he received a creative scholarship from the City of Kraków for the Nasz Ogródek project (Our Little Garden).

== Selected shows ==
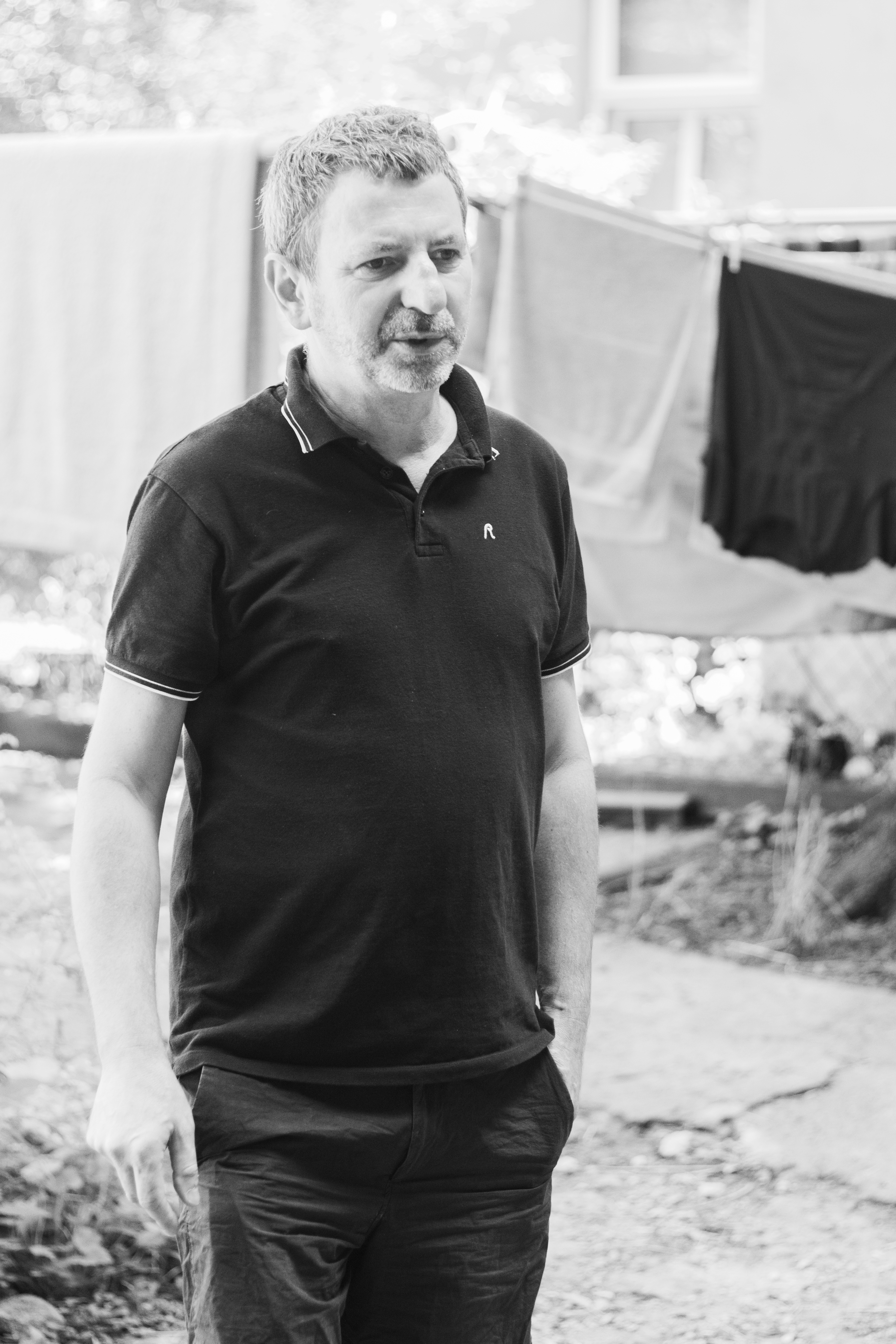
Bogusław Bachorczyk, 2022

Individual shows

- Galeria Floriańska 22, Kraków, 2010;
- Krakauer Hause, Nuremberg, 2010;
- Otwarta Pracownia Gallery, Kraków, 2010;
- Jan Matejko Academy of Fine Arts Gallery, Kraków, 2011;
- Bunkier Sztuki Gallery, Kraków, 2011;
- Nuremberg House, Kraków, 2012;
- Town hall, Nuremberg, 2012;
- Bunkier Sztuki Gallery, Kraków, 2013;
- Piwnica pod Baranami, 2013;
- National Museum in Kraków, 2013;
- Galeria Zderzak, Photo Fringe, Kraków, 2014;
- aTak Gallery, Warsaw, 2015;
- ABC Gallery, 2017;
- Galeria Olympia, 2017;
- Culture and Art Center, Konin, 2017;
- Art Exhibition Bureau, Tarnów, 2017;
- Tatra Museum in Zakopane, 2018;
- Center of Polish Sculpture, Orońsko, 2019.
- Ośmiornica w ekstazie, Mazowiecki Instytut Kultury, Galeria Elektor, Warszawa, 2020;
- Galerie Dolu Michal, Ostrava, 2022;
- Międzynarodowe Centrum Kultury, Kraków, 2024;
- Żal Tropików, Galeria Strefa A, 2024;
- Vlach, Shefter Gallery, curated by Arkadiusz Półtorak, 2025;
- Codziennik. Książki artystyczne i art ziny, Muzeum Drukarstwa w Nowym Targu, 2025

Group shows

- Pamięć. Rejestry i terytoria, International Cultural Centre, Kraków, 2013;
- The castle of Książ, 2013;
- Bunkier Sztuki Gallery, Kraków, 2014;
- ABC Gallery, Poznań, 2014;
- Manggha, Kraków, 2014;
- Galeria Labirynt, Lublin, 2015;
- Photography Museum, Kraków, 2015;
- Baltic Gallery of Contemporary Art, Słupsk, 2016;
- Palace of Culture and Science, Warsaw, 2017;
- Center of Contemporary Art Zamek Ujazdowski, Warsaw, 2017;
- Galeria Potencja, Kraków, 2017;
- Art Exhibition Bureau, Kielce, 2018;
- ArtHouse, Kraków, 2018;
- Krakowski Salon Sztuki, Palace of Art, Kraków, 2019;
- Artyści z Krakowa. Generacja 1950–1969, Museum of Contemporary Art in Kraków, 2020;
- Nasza wystawa. Mokre obrazy. 21, Galeria Olympia, Kraków, 2021;
- Z kurzu w kurz, Cricoteka, 2022;
- Panopticum '21, Muzeum Przyrodnicze Instytutu Systematyki i Ewolucji Zwierząt PAN, 2021;
- Brâncuși. Sculpting with Light, International Cultural Center, Kraków, 2025.

Source.

== Publications ==
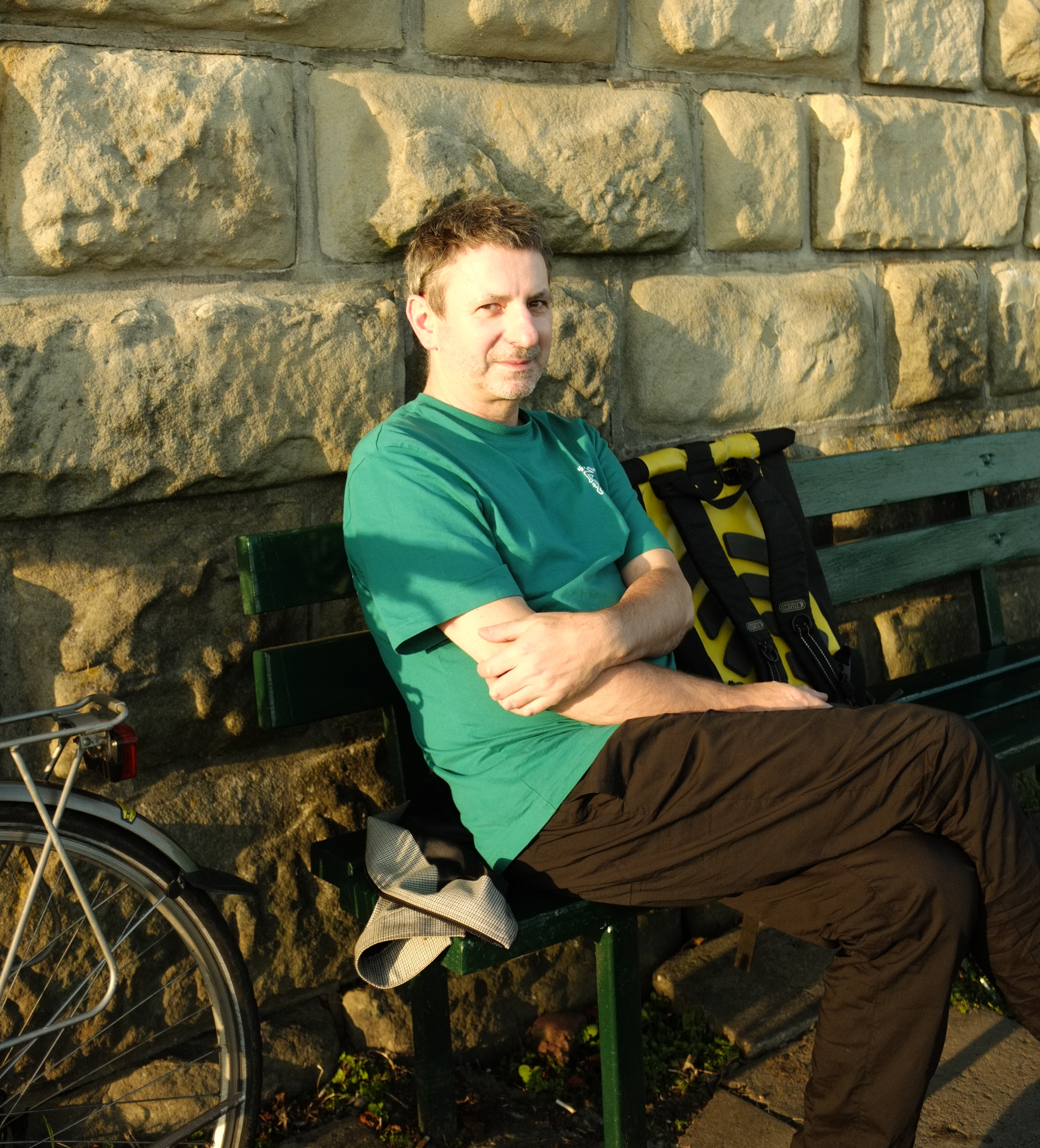
Bogusław Bachorczyk 2021 sierpień 03.jpg

- Czysta 17, Wydawnictwo ASP, Kraków 2013;
- Pamięć, rejestry i terytoria (Exhibition catalog), Międzynarodowe Centrum Kultury, Kraków 2013;
- Wojna i pokój (Exhibition catalog), Galeria Labirynt, Lublin 2015;
- Prosimy nie strzelać, Fundacja Polskiej Sztuki Nowoczesnej, financed by Krzysztof Musiał, Warszawa 2015;
- W poczekalni, with Zbigniew Sałaj, Biuro Wystaw Artystycznych w Tarnowie, Tarnów 2017;
- Roczniki 2017−2018, Wydawnictwo ASP, Kraków 2019.

== Awards ==
- Jan Matejko Academy of Fine Arts Rector's Award, Third Degree, for achievements in artistic and didactic work (2012);
- Jan Matejko Academy of Fine Arts Rector's Award, Second Degree, for achievements in artistic and didactic work (2017);
- Bronze Medal for Merit to Culture – Gloria Artis (2019).
