= Tatarczuk =

Tatarczuk may refer to:

- Waldemar Tatarczuk (born 1964), Polish performance and installation artist and art curator
- Tatarczuk, character in With Fire and Sword (Polish: Ogniem i mieczem), an 1884 historical novel by Henryk Sienkiewicz
