= Kocur =

Kocur (Polish pronunciation: [ˈkɔt͡sur]) is a surname which means "tomcat" in Polish and Slovak. It is a cognate of the Czech surname Kocour and East Slavic Kotsur.

Kocur may refer to:

- Joe Kocur (born 1964), Canadian ice hockey player
- Kory Kocur (born 1969), Canadian ice hockey player
- Miroslav Kocur, Slovak microbiologist
- Kijewski / Kocur, Polish artists

== See also ==
- Kotsur
