= Łukasz Białkowski =

Polish art critic, curator, translator, lecturer (born 1981)

- Born: 1981 (age 44–45)
- Citizenship: Polish
- Occupations: art critic, curator, translator, university lecturer
- Website: lukaszbialkowski.wordpress.com

Łukasz Białkowski (born 1981) is an art critic, independent curator, translator and university lecturer.

== Biography ==
His research lies at the intersection of art philosophy and media social history. He focuses particularly on historical narratives of creativity and the cultural figures of the artist, as well as their relationship to the evolution of the field of artistic production, exhibition institutions, and art distribution systems. He is a member of International Association of Art Critics.

He has published his texts in numerous magazines, exhibition catalogues, and monographic studies. In 2011 he received his doctoral degree at the Faculty of Philosophy at the Jagiellonian University for a dissertation on the transformations of the figure of the artist in twentieth century aesthetics.

From 2010 to 2011, he was editor-in-chief of the quarterly “MOCAK Forum”. From 2012 to 2013, he was program director of the BWA Sokół Gallery in Nowy Sącz. He runs the visual arts section of the quarterly “Opcje”. He holds the Assistant Professorship at the Faculty of Arts at the University of the National Education Commission and is a lecturer at the Academy of Fine Arts in Krakow.

In 2022 he co-curated exhibition Krakowski spleen at 1891 Garni Hotel in Kraków, organized by Ufo Art Gallery.

== Books ==
- Figury na biegunach. Narracje silnego i słabego podmiotu twórczego (2015)
- Nieszczere pole. Szkice o sztuce (2015)
- Celebracja braku (2020)
- Utopia na ludzką miarę. Cyniczne wprowadzenie do estetyki relacyjnej (2024)

Source.
