= Tomasz Vetulani =

Polish painter, drawer, and sculptor (born 1965)

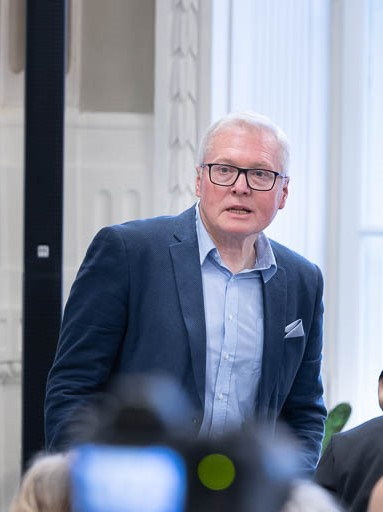
- Tomasz Vetulani, April 2022
- Born: Tomasz Jerzy Vetulani; 21 December 1965 (age 60); Kraków, Poland
- Citizenship: Polish
- Education: Jan Matejko Academy of Fine Arts, Royal Academy of Fine Arts in Ghent
- Known for: painting, drawing, sculpture
- Website: www.vetulani.nl

Tomasz Jerzy Vetulani (born 21 December 1965) is a Polish painter, drawer and sculptor. Born and educated in Kraków, he moved to Utrecht in 1991, and he has been active there since, holding also a citizenship of the Netherlands. In his works, using among others silicone and sponge, he includes both personal references and comments on current political and social issues.

== Life and work ==
He was born on 21 December 1965 in Kraków as the second son of Jerzy Vetulani and Maria née Pająk, younger brother of Marek. He was baptized by bishop Karol Wojtyła, who acquainted his parents and grandparents.

He attended the August Witkowski 5th High School, where he passed matura. He studied at the Jan Matejko Academy of Fine Arts, at the Faculty of Painting (1986–1991), and graduated from the studio held by professor Juliusz Joniak. During the studies he shortly collaborated with a renowned artist Tadeusz Kantor. In 1990 he went to Israel for two semesters to study at the University of Haifa. In 1992–1993 he studied at the Academy of Fine Arts in Ghent, holding a scholarship from the Flemish Community of Belgium and the Minister of Culture of Poland.

In Poland, Vetulani made his debut in 1992 with a group exhibition at the Stawski Gallery in Kraków. In 1994 he was among the awarded at the 31st National Painting Exhibition Bielska Jesień organised by Galeria BWA, and in 2002 he was nominated for the Daniel Chodowiecki Award for Polish drawing and graphic art.

In 1991 he moved to Utrecht, Netherlands, where he has since been living and working. In Utrecht, he was commissioned to design several sculptures in public space, including the balustrade of the bridge over the canal between Bleyenburgstraat and Huizingalaan called Eendjesbrug (The Duck Bridge, 2014) and the sculpture titled De Stoel (The Chair) at the Voorveldse Polder Park (2018).

His works have been shown at several dozen individual and collective exhibitions in Poland, the Netherlands, Germany and Norway, including at the Ujazdów Castle Centre for Contemporary Art in Warsaw, Museum of Contemporary Art in Kraków, Galeria BWA in Bielsko-Biała, Bunkier Sztuki Gallery for Contemporary Art, Contemporary Art Gallery in Opole, and in private galleries. Since 2014, he exhibits at the Galeria Olympia in Kraków.

The critics of Tomasz Vetulani's work noticed that “the artist juggles with ease and defiance with various means of expression and media” creating critical works with "strong social and political connotations”, “mocking and ironic character”, in which he looks at Poland “with great concern (...) from the perspective of an emigrant, from the differently shaped, both culturally and socially, Netherlands, which has become his new homeland”, yet on the other hand he creates “subtle images-objects”, showing mostly a female figure, in which he “deliberately rejects the classic beauty of a figure in favor of fragility, transience or simply greater sensitivity to what is present”.

In his painting, among other techniques, Vetulani often uses sketch and watercolour, he works with oil paint and silicone, sometimes adding old photographs to paintings and collages. Interviewed in 1998, he said that he likes working on sponge “because it's a simple, light material and always ready to use. The colour and texture meet my aesthetic requirements and it has a lot of volume and physically, is very present in the space. The ink or paint is immediately absorbed into the foam surface, making any corrections almost impossible. It is a material which lends itself to quick, fast application and is particularly good for spontaneous sketching with paint squeezed directly from the tube. The fact that these works will not last (sponge is not a very durable material) does not deter me; it suits the character of the work very well and to an extent reflects my ideas about art”. He is inspired, among others, by religious architecture and the surrounding Dutch nature and landscape.

He has three children and declares as atheist.

== Selected shows ==
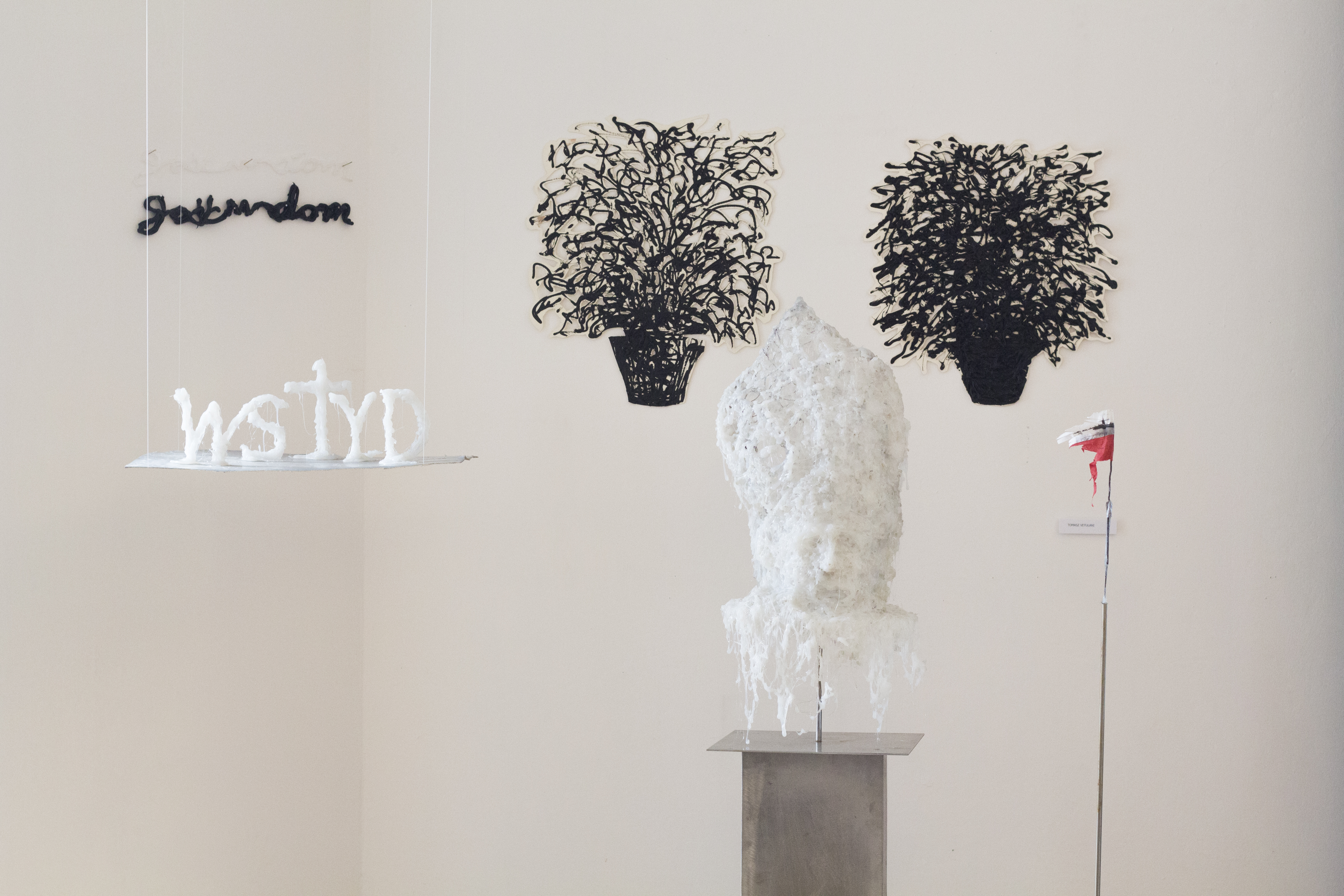
Vetulani's show in 2016, courtesy of Galeria Olympia

Individual shows

- 1994: Moira, Utrecht
- 1996: Sluijmer & Van Leeuwen, Utrecht
- 1997: Hordaland Kunstnersentrum, Bergen
- 1999: Galleri Allmenningen, Bergen
- 2000: Galerie De Verrasing, Utrecht
- 2001: Expositieruimte Stichting 1/2, Rotterdam
- 2001: INTERDRUCK Schipper+Patitz, Lipsk
- 2003: Galerie Besselaar, Utrecht
- 2005: EM Galerie, Kollum
- 2009: Solo tentoonstelling Windesheim, Zwolle
- 2011: Galeria Aneks, Opole
- 2013: Galerie Niek Waterbolk, Utrecht
- 2014: Site inspection, Galeria Olympia, Kraków
- 2017: (Re)search: schetsen en sculpturen, Museum Warsenhoeck, Nieuwegein
- 2017: There is no threat. Weapons and colour, Galeria Olympia, Kraków
- 2020: Art in a time of the Plague, Galerie Niek Waterbolk, Utrecht
- 2023: Pucheroki, Galeria R, Faculty of Sculpture, Jan Matejko Academy of Fine Arts, Kraków

Group shows

- 1992: Stawski Gallery, Kraków
- 1994: Galeria BWA, Bielsko-Biała
- 1995: Krąg, Bunkier Sztuki, Kraków
- 1997: Krajobraz końca XX wieku, Bielska Jesień
- 1998: At the time of writing, the Center for Contemporary Art Ujazdowski Castle, Warsaw
- 1999: Galerie de Verrasing, Utrecht
- 2002: BWA Sopot, Daniel Chodowiecki/Günter Grass Graphics Competition, Sopot
- 2003: Deutsches Textil Museum, “Kirche und Design”, Krefeld
- 2005: ART Poznań, Poznań
- 2016: Galerie Regio Art Rijnmond, Spijkenisse
- 2018: Juliusz Joniak and his students, Studio 124, Palace of Art in Kraków
- 2018: Multi-Kulti, Dom Norymberski in Kraków
- 2018: Regaining dignity. Poland is a dream, Galeria Olympia, Kraków
- 2020: Artists from Krakow: The Generation 1950–1969, MOCAK Museum of Contemporary Art in Kraków

== Family ==
Vetulani family

* the list is incomplete

Michał Vetulani	Franciszka (née Śliwińska)
Jan	Matylda (née Pisz)	Roman	Elżbieta (née Kunachowicz)	Franciszek; Latinik	Franciszek	Katarzyna (née Ipohorska)
Eugeniusz	Kazimierz	Zygmunt	Tadeusz	Maria (née Godlewska)	Adam	Irena (née Latinik)	Zofia	Bohdan de Nisau	Maria	Cecylia
Armand	Wanda	Zygmunt	Grażyna (née Świerczyńska)	Krystyna	Jerzy	Maria (née Pająk)	Witold
Agnieszka	Maria	Charles	Tomasz
