= Michał Iwański =

Polish painter (born 1994)

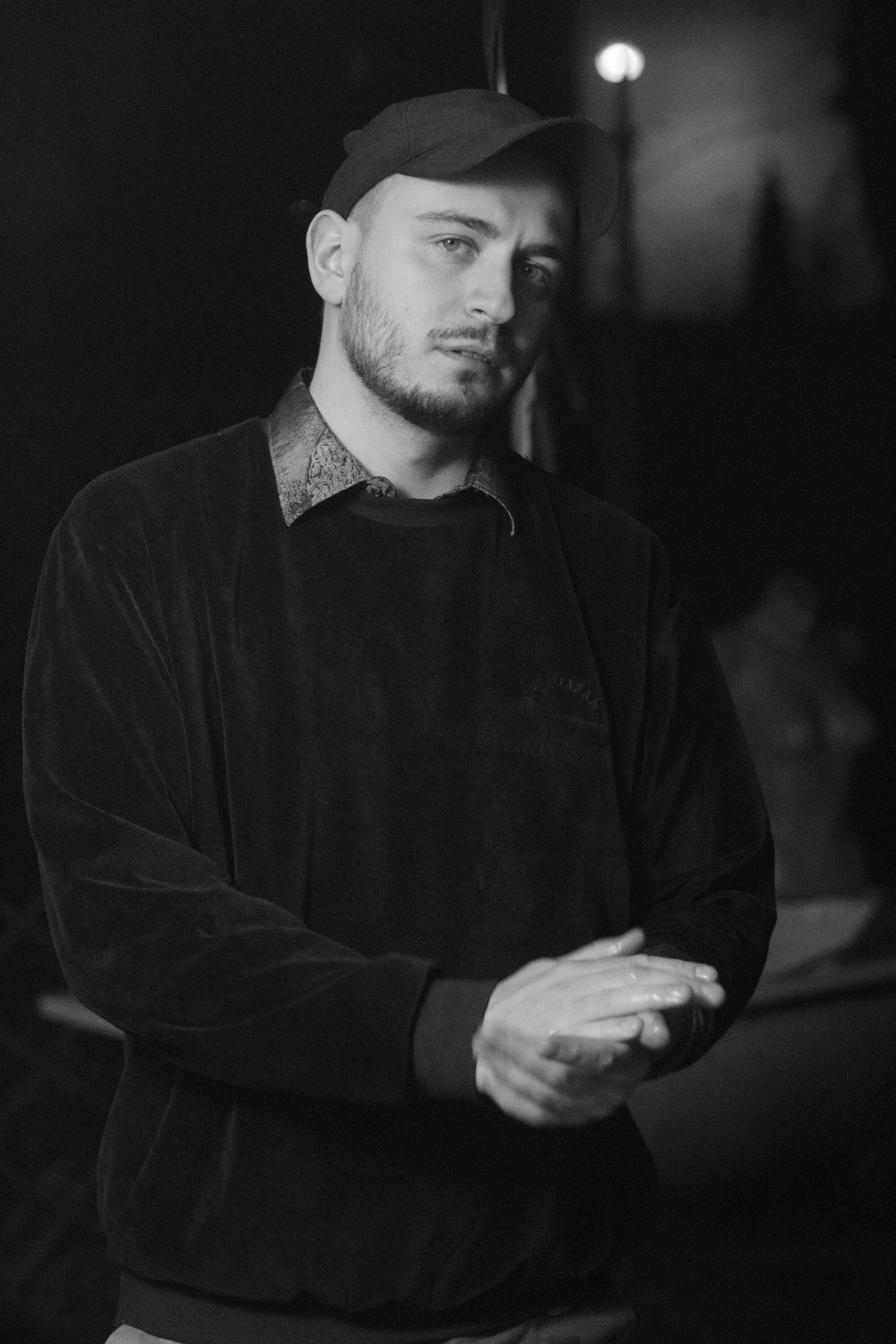
- Michał Iwański, 2021
- Born: 1994 (age 31–32)
- Education: Jan Matejko Academy of Fine Arts
- Known for: painting, video, ready-made, site-specific

Michał Iwański (born 1994) is a Polish painter, creator of video, ready-made and site-specific.

== Biography ==
During his studies at the Academy of Fine Arts in Kraków he took part in numerous group exhibitions. In 2018 he was a co-founder of the Bałuckiego 15 art collective. Also in 2018, he was the winner of the competition at the Young Wolves Art Festival in Szczecin. Then, as an Erasmus scholarship holder, he studied at the Faculty of Fine Arts at the University of Lisbon. In 2020, he graduated from the Faculty of Painting at the Academy of Fine Arts in Kraków in the studio of Bogusław Bachorczyk and defended his master's degree. His diploma work was shown at an exhibition at the Galeria Olympia in Kraków. As part of the Erasmus+ program, he completed an internship in the studio of Egill Sæbjörnsson in Berlin. In 2023 he was awarded in the Oknoplast for Art competition.

== Exhibitions ==
- Spacer w mojej głowie, Galeria Olympia, Kraków, 2020
- Czy jest jakieś wyjście stąd?, Solvay, Kraków, 2021
- 30. Ogólnopolski Przegląd Malarstwa Młodych Promocje, Legnica, 2021–2022
- Sto lat w labiryncie, Galeria Labirynt, Lublin, 2024–2025
- Konie hazard, group exhibition, Sarego 10, Kraków, 2026
- The Shape of a Scar, group exhibition, Jak Zapomnieć Gallery, Kraków, 2026
- Anioły zostawione w szatni, BWA Wrocław Główny, 2026; with Michał Kowalczys
