= Luxus group =

Polish art group

Luxus was an artistic group from Wrocław active in the eighties and nineties of the twentieth century.

The Luxus group was founded at the turn of 1980/1981 in studio 314 at the State Higher School of Fine Arts in Wrocław; initially as a group of friends and colleagues. Since 1986, the group has been creating the handmade art zine Luxus.

The group was formed by, among others, Jerzy Kosałka, Marek Czechowski, Paweł Jarodzki, Bożena Grzyb-Jarodzka, Ewa Ciepielewska, Stanisław Sielicki, Artur Gołacki, Piotr Gusta, Małgorzata Plata, Szymon Lubiński, Jacek „Ponton” Jankowski, Andrzej Jarodzki, Krzysztof Kubiak and Krzysztof Kłosowicz (Kaman).

== Bibliography ==
- Mituś, Anna; Stasiowski, Piotr (2014). Agresywna niewinność. Historia grupy Luxus. BWA Wrocław Galerie Sztuki Współczesnej.
- Mituś, Anna (2015). "Scena artystyczna we Wrocławiu w latach osiemdziesiątych XX wieku". In Dorota Monkiewicz (ed.). Dzikie Pola. Historia awangardowego Wrocławia. Warszawa: Zachęta Narodowa Galeria Sztuki.
