= Olga Drenda =

Polish anthropologist

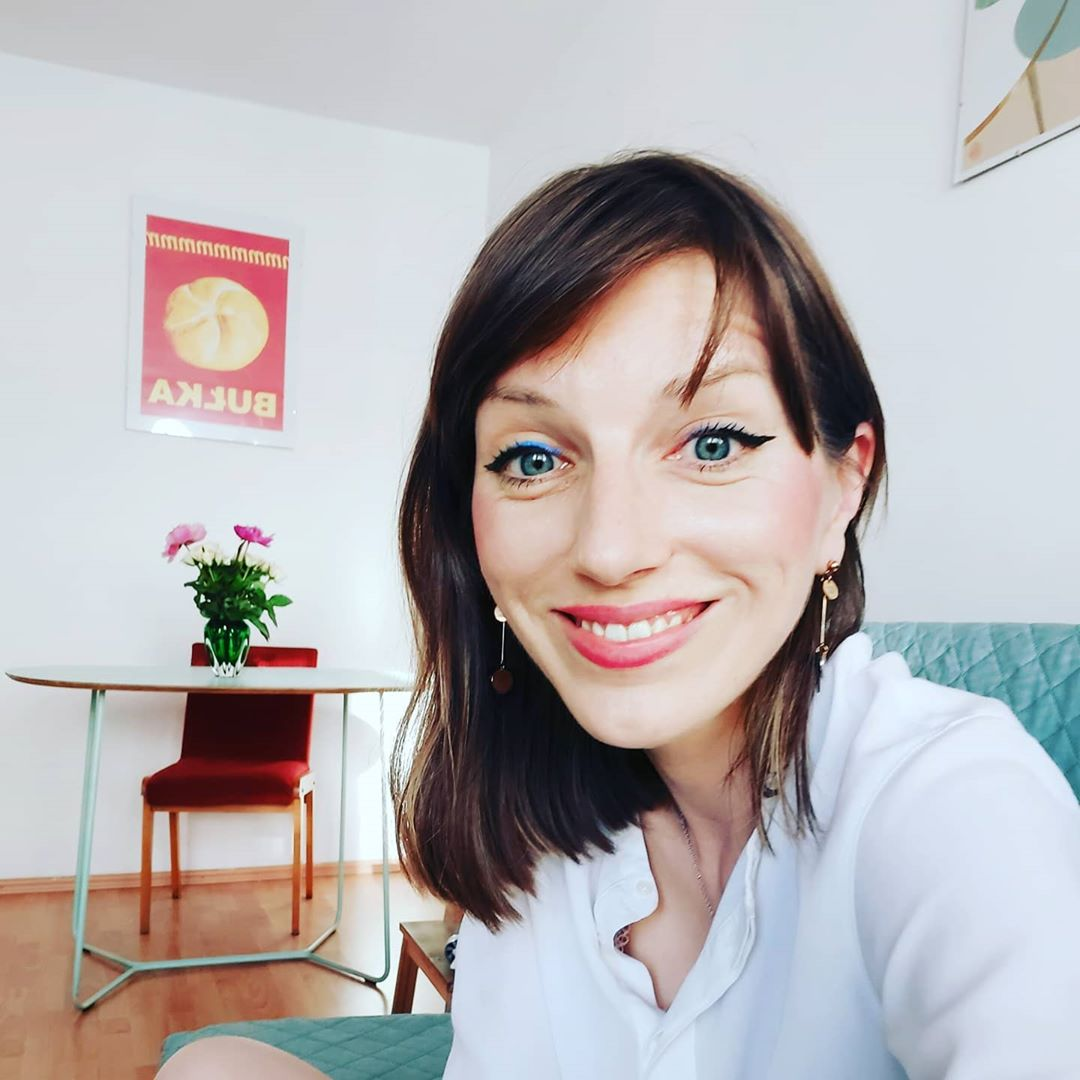
- Self-portrait, 2020
- Born: 1984 (age 41–42); Poland
- Education: Jagiellonian University
- Occupation: Writer
- Partner: Andrzej Klimek
- Writing career
- Language: Polish
- Period: 21st century
- Genre: Sociocultural anthropology
- Subject: Polish cultural history
- Notable work: Duchologia polska
- Notable awards: Paszport Polityki 2018 Wyroby – Nominee; Gdynia Literary Prize 2019 Wyroby
- Website: Olga Drenda on Instagram

Olga Drenda (born 1984) is a Polish anthropologist, cultural historian, translator, writer and author. She has an interest in popular culture, and everyday life and objects from late 20th century Poland covering the period of the Polish People's Republic to the transition from communism.

== Biography ==
Drenda spent her early childhood being raised in her parents home, an osiedle in the Ligota area of Katowice, which later became well known for featuring in the television series The Mire. After the age of ten her family settled in Mikołów.

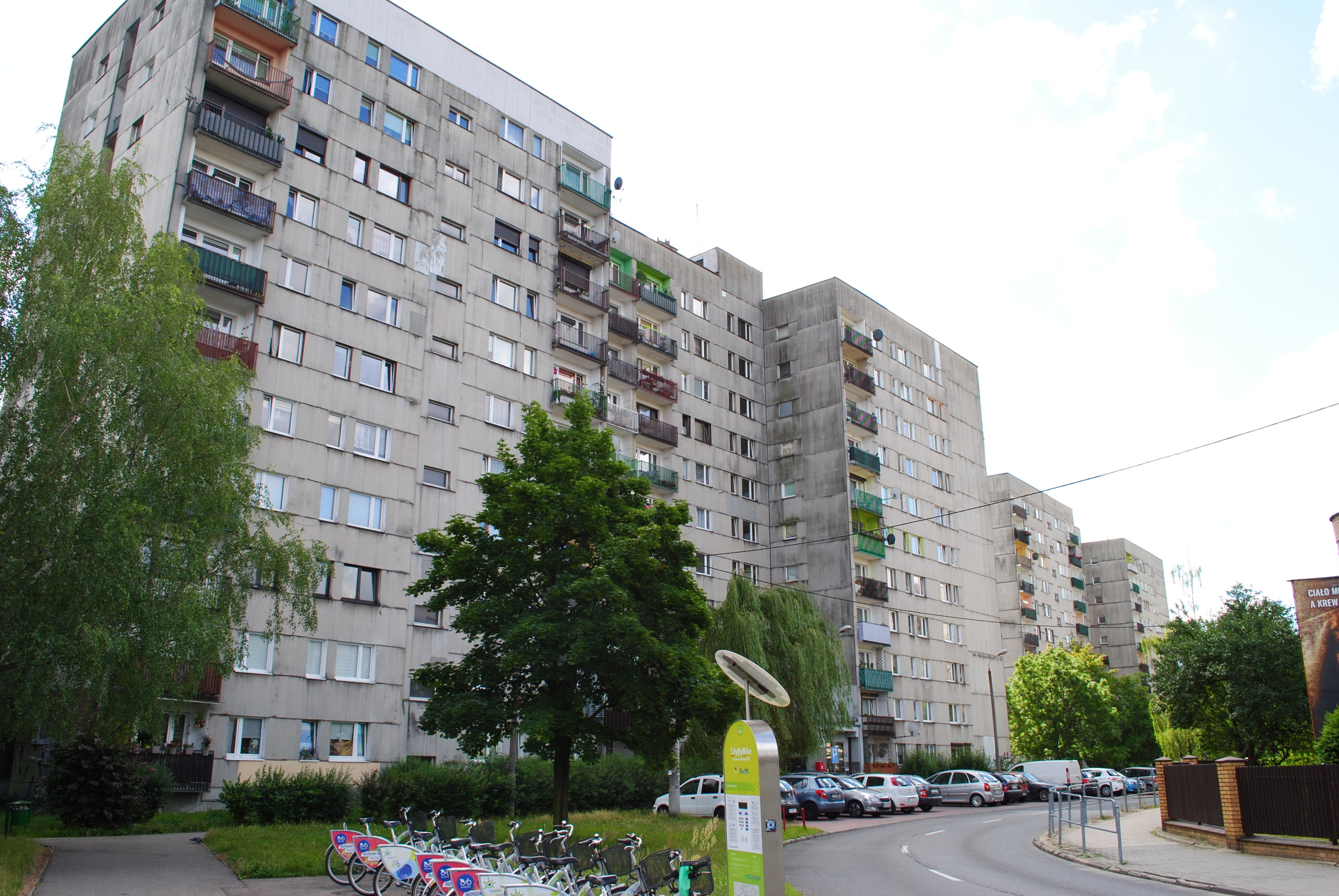
The osiedle where Drenda spent her formative years

In 2004 Drenda started her first blogs while at university, which covered themes around everyday life, literature, and personal reflections. At the time she worked for an advertising agency specialising in translating copy, however due to a chronic health condition Drenda opted to follow a career as a freelance writer. In the lead up to Euro 2012 Drenda began to intensively photograph everyday street scenes and architecture in the realisation that much of it would be lost due to rapid redevelopment in preparation for Poland hosting the tournament. That year she started the Duchologia page on Tumblr and Facebook which was intended to archive the everyday life of Poland's transition from communism.

In 2016 Drenda published her seminal book Ducholgia polska, which focused on the material experience of Poland's transition from communism through the prism of Jacques Derrida's concept of hauntology. A later publication titled Wyroby, drew on her previous book in discussing commercial products and domestic objects from the post-war period of Polish history to the 21st century. While facing some criticism for not including the opinion of more historical experts, the art historian Maria Poprzęcka praised Drenda for her anthropological expertise in Wyroby.

Drenda has worked on various translations, including the Polish editions of William S. Burroughs's The Soft Machine and The Ticket That Exploded from his Nova Trilogy. She has also translated the work of Małgorzata Rejmer into English.

Drenda has lectured at the National Museum in Kraków. In 2024 it was announced that she would be the creative director of that years Conrad Festival. Since September 2024 Drenda has been the co-host of the PR4 show Drenda i Paśnik w Czwórce.

== Personal life ==
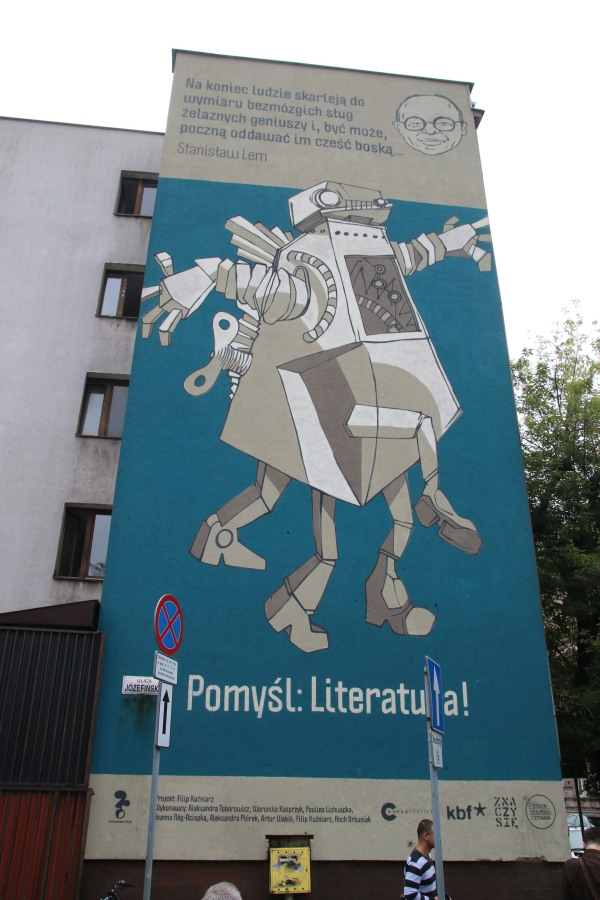
One of Drenda's favourite murals in Kraków

Drenda has previously lived in Gdańsk, and since 2018 has resided in the Warsaw district of Mokotów with her partner Andrzej Klimek. Drenda is a fan of piosenka poetycka, a form of Polish sung poetry. She has described Filip Kuźniarz's tribute to Stanisław Lem as one of Kraków's best pieces of street art. Drenda has a collection of pop and disco cassette's from which she sometimes DJ's.

== Awards ==
Her book Wyroby: Pomysłowość wokół nas won the Gdynia Literary Prize, as well as being nominated for the Paszport Polityki award.

== Works ==
- Drenda, Olga (2016). Duchologia polska: Rzeczy i ludzie w latach transformacji (in Polish). Karakter. ISBN 8365271125.
- Dobroczyński, Bartłomiej; Drenda, Olga (2017). Czyje jest nasze życie? (in Polish). Znak. ISBN 8324043926.
- Drenda, Olga; Rusznica, Łukasz (2018). Subterranean River. Kraków: Fundacja Sztuk Wizualnych. ISBN 836297835X.
- Drenda, Olga (2018). Wyroby: Pomysłowość wokół nas (in Polish). Karakter. ISBN 8365271753.
- Drenda, Olga (2019). ""Zrób To Sam": the Legacy of the DIY Approach in Polish Vernacular Creativity". In Chmara, Maciej; Rosinke, Ania (eds.). Essays on Kitchens. Leipzig: Spector. ISBN 9783959053280.
- Drenda, Olga; Halber, Małgorzata (2020). Książka o miłości (in Polish). Znak Literanova. ISBN 978-83-240-7210-1.
- Błaszczyk, Dawid; Czechowicz, Tomasz; Janus, Maciej; Misiak, Marian, eds. (2021). Radical Passion: The Worlds Longest Produced Electric Train and a Vibrant Train Culture. Translated by Drenda, Olga. Wrocław: Tory Press & Threedotstype. ISBN 978-83-954954-3-4.
- Drenda, Olga (2023). Słowo humoru (in Polish). Karakter. ISBN 8367016890.
