= Waldemar Tatarczuk =

Waldemar Tatarczuk (b. 1964) is a performance and installation artist, and art curator. He was the founder and curator of Performance Art Centre in Lublin (1999–2010), and director of Galeria Labirynt (Labyrinth Gallery) in Lublin (2010-2025). He works in Lublin, Poland.

== Early life ==
He was born in Siemiatycze, Poland.

== Career ==
He has been active as a performance artist since 1988. He took part in performance art events throughout Europe, including at the International Festival of Performance Art Infr'Action in Paris; in Asia, where he performed in Beijing and Thailand; and at 11d in Toronto, Canada.

He has curated exhibitions and festivals, including the Festiwal Art Kontakt in Lubin in 2000; Discovering Europe (exhibition) in Lubin in 2004; Days of Performance Art in Lviv in 2008, 2009 and 2010.

== Collections ==
Tatarczuk has three works in the permanent collections of Filmoteka Museum, and 69 photographs, a video and a set of 67 additional photographs held in the Lee Wen Archive of the Asia Art Archive, Hong Kong.
