= Kotsur =

Kotsur (Cyrillic: Коцур) is a Ukrainian surname. It is a cognate of Kocur (Polish, Slovak) and Kocour (Czech). Kotsur may refer to:

- Andrei Kotsur (born 1982), Belarusian kickboxer
- Pavel Kotsur (born 1974), Kazakhstani chess grandmaster
- Svyryd Kotsur (1890–1920), Ukrainian insurgent during the War of Independence
- Troy Kotsur (born 1968), American actor

== See also ==
- Kocur
