= Jerzy Bereś =

Polish sculptor, author and performance artist (1930–2012)

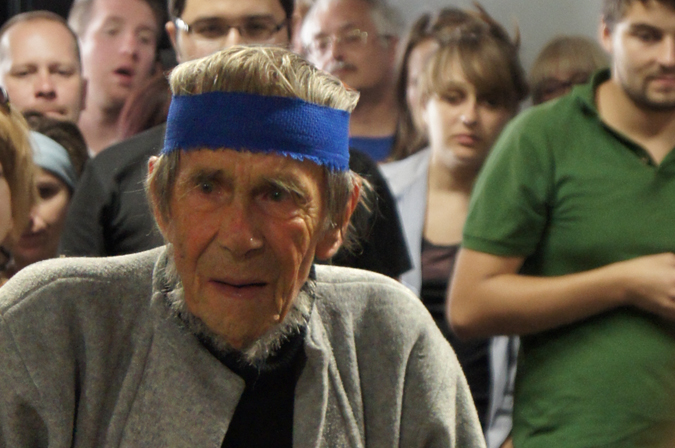
- Bereś during a festival in Sokołowsko, at what would be his final public performance, 2012
- Born: 14 September 1930; Nowy Sącz, Kraków Voivodeship, Second Polish Republic
- Died: 25 December 2012 (aged 82); Cracow, Lesser Poland Voivodeship, Third Polish Republic
- Occupations: sculptor, author and performance artist

Jerzy Bereś (14 September 1930 – 25 December 2012) was a Polish sculptor, author and performance artist.

== Life ==
Bereś was born on 14 September 1930 in Nowy Sącz. He died on 25 December 2012 in Kraków.

== Creativity ==
In his work he used artistic manifestations. His works and projects were often political and ethical statements, preaching the demand of the "creative act" on the subject. Bereś developed his own unique style, but his practices were related: happening and these performance, although I never admit to any relationship with these trends in the arts demonstrations, calling their actions (actions, "Masses "). Bereś' Art is an art symbol, a metaphor, and a metaphysics. His art is the result of a dispute with known artist of the twentieth century such as the dramatists Witkiewicz, Kantor and conceptual artist, Duchamp.

== Artistic activity ==
In 1956, Bereś completed a program in sculpture in the Jan Matejko Academy of Fine Arts under Xawery Dunikowski.

His first solo exhibition was in 1958 in the Kraków House of Artists, where he presented the sculptures 'Lullaby', 'The Sun', 'Mother', 'Eve', 'Anxiety', and 'Idyll', made of plaster and reinforced concrete. His experience at this exhibition influenced his decision to halt the work he had been doing up to this point and, along with it, the traditional methods he learned from the Academy of Fine Arts in Kraków. Just before 1960, he created his first sculptures of wood: 'Rzepicha' and 'Bart'. However, these were very realistic renderings that led the artist to turn to minimalism. Since then, his sculptures in wood have become increasingly simple and stay as close as possible to the nature of the material used. In 1960, he created work out of natural materials in the series Hallucinations and in 1967 in the series The Oracle. He used field stones, hemp rope, scraps of canvas bag, and leather straps (the characteristic materials for his work).

In 1968, Beres presented in Foksal Gallery in Warsaw the first artistic manifestation of prophecy 'I'. It opens up a whole series of speeches that are a commentary on politics, religion, art and philosophy, in which the artist often uses his own body and the object. His work called "Masses" discusses the most important Polish problems: the Mass Romantic, the political Mass, and the Mass in Polish.

== Selected performances ==
- 1968 - Prophecy, Gallery Foksal, Kraków
- 1968 - The Prophecy II, Gallery Krzysztofory, Kraków
- 1968 - Bread, painted black, Gallery Krzysztofory, Kraków
- 1972 - bread colorfully painted, Office Andrzej Partum Poetry, Warsaw
- 1972 - Transfiguration and Art Center, Södertälje
- 1973 - Transfiguration II, Gallery Desa, Kraków
- 1973 - Transfiguration III Fri Altar author, BWA, Lublin
- 1973 - Untitled, Contemporary Gallery, Warsaw
- 1973 - Bid, Gallery Pi, Kraków
- 1974 - wooden pathway, Gruga Park, Essen
- 1974 - a beautiful altar, the altar clean, BWA, Wrocław
- 1974 - Face The Altar, Studio Gallery, London
- 1975 - reflective Mass, the Metal Works. Szadkowski, Kraków
- 1975 - The Altar erotic Coffee Club Artists, Kraków
- 1975 - The Altar laughing MDK Art Gallery of Labyrinth, Lublin
- 1975 - Round honor, Runek Old Town, Zamosc
- 1976 - Bonfire of art, BWA, Koszalin
- 1976 - Altar sculpture, BWA, Kraków
- 1976 - The Rite sincerity, Gallery On The Floor boat
- 1976 - existential Ritual, Culture, Lublin
- 1976 - Altar of time, Castle Świdwin
- 1976 - The Rite philosophical, student club, Toruń
- 1977 - culture ritual, Riviera Club Student Repair, London
- 1977 - Life's Work, STU Theatre Gallery, Kraków
- 1977 - art Mass, Club Jaszczury, Kraków
- 1978 - artist Monument, the way of Warcino and Kępice
- 1978 - Philosopher's Stone, Gallery Labyrinth, Lublin
- 1978 - Mass Art, Gallery Encouragement, London
- 1978 - Mass Romantic, Gallery Krzysztofory, Kraków
- 1979 - philosophical Mass, Gallery Art-Forum, boat
- 1979 - author Mass, Gallery of Modern Art, "HOUSE", Wrocław
- 1979 - avant-garde Mass, National Outdoor Young Artists and theorists, Świeszyno
- 1979 - Work and Word Haus van Kapel Bewaring Amsterdam
- 1979 - Mystery, Midland Group Gallery, Nottingham, the Academy Gallery in Liverpool, Cotes Watermill in Loughborough, Fine Art Dept. University of Technology, Wolverhampton, Chapter Arts Centre in Cardiff, Kennington Oval House in London
- 1979 - Opus, College of Higher Education in Hull, Gallery Third Eye Center, Glasgow
- 1980 - dialogue with Ignacy Witkiewicz, Polish Artists Union Gallery "Prism", Kraków
- 1980 - political Mass, National Outdoor Young Artists and theorists, Świeszyno
- 1981 - Clean work, Gallery Krzysztofory, Kraków
- 1981 - freedom Barrows Meetings International Artists, Scientists and theoreticians of art, Osieki
- 1981 - dialogue with Marcel Duchamp, Gallery BWA, Lublin
- 1981 - Manifestation romantic, the main square, Kraków
- 1981 - image, Academy of Music, Kraków
- 1983 - Art and Reality, Gallery BWA, Lublin
- 1983 - Mass Reflection II, Gallery Krzysztofory, Kraków
- 1984 - Polish Mass Over the Moat Gallery, Wrocław
- 1984 - Lecture: The dispute over the value of the highest. And part of the Gallery BWA, Lublin
- 1985 - Five outbreaks of Church. Divine Mercy, London
- 1986 - Lecture: The dispute over the value of the highest. II, Gallery BWA, Lublin
- 1986 - Picture Polish, Gallery Dziekanka, Warsaw
- 1988 - The Prophecy II, Gallery Krzysztofory, Kraków
- 1988 - II dialogue with Marcel Duchamp, Modern Art Oxford, Oxford
- 1988 - image of the Polish, Slaughterhouse Gallery, London
- 1989 - the second presentation of the living monument. The Prophecy II University Gallery, Cieszyn
- 1989 - shame, CRP, Orońsko
- 1990 - Untitled, Gallery BWA, Green Mountain
- 1990 - III dispute with Marcel Duchamp CCA, London
- 1991 - Dispute with Ignacy Witkiewicz BWA, Koszalin
- 1991 - IV dispute with Marcel Duchamp, Museum Bochum - Kunstsammlung, Bochum
- 1991 - dialogue with Tadeusz Kantor, Gallery Krzysztofory, Kraków
- 1991 - Antyperformance Action Arts Center, Warsaw
- 1993 - Polish Erotic, National Museum, London
- 1993 - Presentation of the living monument. The Prophecy II, BWA, Wrocław
- 1994 - The Challenge, Gallery Encouragement, London
- 1994 - Challenge II, Gallery BWA, Lublin
- 1995 - Monument Vivant, Gallery Le Lieu, Quebec
- 1995 - The last dispute with Marcel Duchamp, Gallery Language Plus, Alma
- 1997 - Duel Challenge IV of Utopia, Gallery Manhattan, boat
- 1999 - Scream, Museum of Sandomierz, Castle, Sandomierz
- 2012 - Toast II, Contexts. II Ephemeral Art Festival, Sokołowsko

== Outdoor projects ==
- Wladyslaw Jagiello monument in Nidzica
- Altar of St. Families in the Church of Our Lady of Fatima in Tarnów
- Rondo sculpture 1 in front of the Opera in Bydgoszcz

== Bibliography ==
- George Beres, hallucinations, oracles, altars, challenges occur category. National Museum in Poznan, National Museum in Kraków, Poznań and Kraków, 1995, ISBN 83-85296-34-4
- George Beres, Art bending force, angle occur. Contemporary Art, Kraków 2007
- Avant-garde in the open air: Osieki and Lazy 1963–1981. Poland awngarda the second half of the twentieth century in the collection of the Museum in Koszalin., Ed. Museum in Koszalin, Koszalin 2008, ISBN 978-83-89463-07-4
