= Samuel Kłoda =

Polish painter (born 1998)

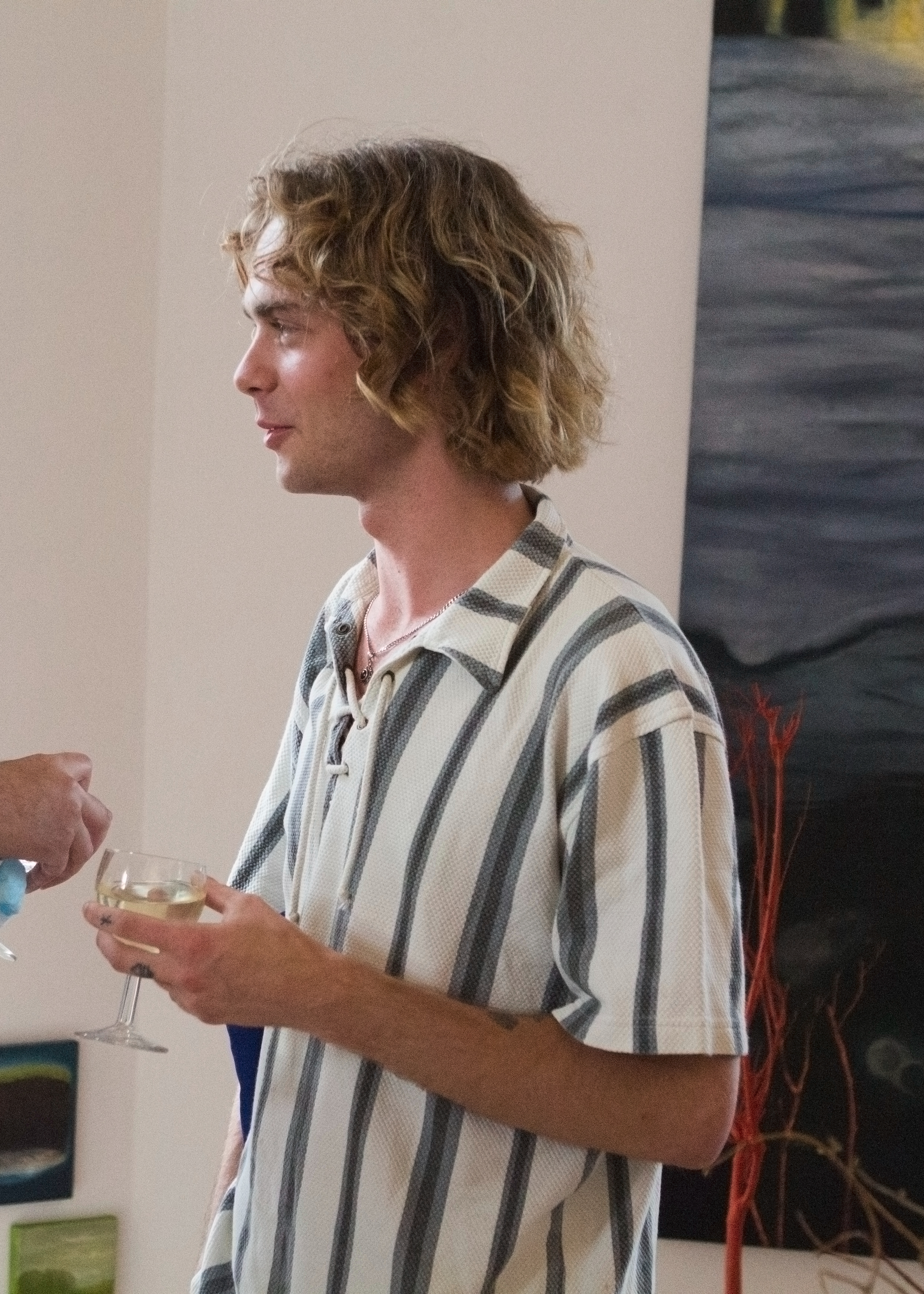
- Samuel Kłoda, 2021
- Born: 1998 (age 27–28); Cieszyn
- Education: Jan Matejko Academy of Fine Arts
- Known for: painting

Samuel Kłoda (born 1998) is a Polish painter.

== Biography ==
He graduated from an art high school in Cieszyn and from the Faculty of Painting at the Academy of Fine Arts in Cracow in the studio of Grzegorz Bednarski. He was a finalist of the Biennale of Painting “Bielska Jesień” in 2021, the 12th Triennale of Small Painting Forms at Toruń Wozownia Art Gallery (2022) and the “New Image, New Look” competition (2022). He was awarded at the 2nd Biennale of Painting “Lublin Spring” in 2022. He won the first prize in the Leon Wyczółkowski National Painting Competition in Bydgoszcz (2022) and an honorable mention at the 46th “Bielska Jesień” Painting Biennale in 2023.

In his works, he uses the motif of nature and symbols and “utilizing them as universal vehicles for everyday things”. His paintings depict landscapes “bordering on dream and reality, painted from the imagination”. Materiality and color have been described as “values in his paintings”.

In 2023 Kamil Kuitkowski described Samuel Kłoda's works exhibited at the students' year-end exhibition at the Academy of Fine Arts in Kraków as "uncompromisingly "ugly" painting, which seems to chew and spit out the academic painting that surrounds it".

== Exhibitions ==
- Pozaziemskie ogrody rozkoszy, with Kamila Stovrag, Ostrowiecki Browar Kultury, Ostrowiec Świętokrzyski
- Gdzie są obrazy, których jeszcze nie namalowano, Otwarta Pracownia, Kraków, 2023
- 16. Jesienny Salon Sztuki Loostro, BWA Ostrowiec, Ostrowiec Świętokrzyski, 2023
- Losowy generator obrazków po końca świata, Cracow Art Week, 2023
- Cracow Art Fair, Widna Gallery, 2023
- Tip of My Tongue, Pola Magnetyczne Gallery, 2023
- Rajski ptak, with Kamila Stovrag, BWA Ostrowiec Świętokrzyski, 2024
- Tak naprawdę to wcale nie wyjechaliśmy, Cracow Art Week, Widna Gallery, Kraków, 2024
- No Title, group exhibition, Ufo Art Gallery, Kraków, 2025–2026
- Kolorami mnie ratuj, group exhibition, Międzynarodowe Centrum Sztuk Graficznych, Kraków, 2026
- Konie hazard, group exhibition, Sarego 10, Kraków, 2026
- Creak, Crash and Crow, Ufo Art Gallery, curated by Michalina Sablik, 2026.
