= Bogumił Książek =

Polish painter (born 1974)

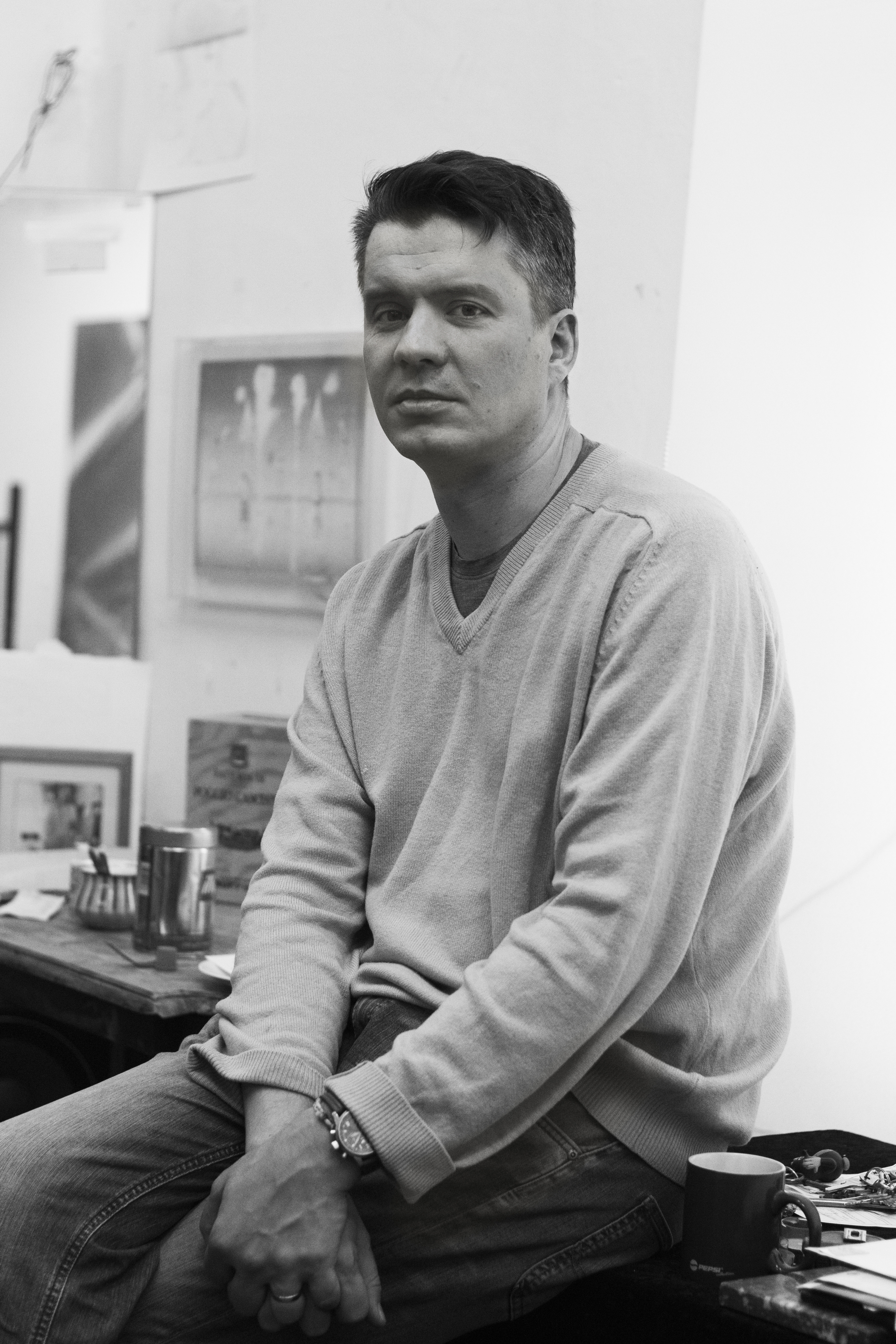
- Bogumił Książek in 2019
- Born: 4 December 1974 (age 51); Kraków
- Citizenship: Polish
- Education: Jan Matejko Academy of Fine Arts
- Known for: painting
- Website: bogumilksiazek.pl

Bogumił Książek (born 4 December 1974) is a Polish painter.

== Biography ==
The son of Maria Rostworowska − a translator and writer, he was raised in the Salwator district in Kraków, and graduated from the High School of Arts.

He studied philosophy at the Jagiellonian University and painting at the Academy of Fine Arts in Kraków. During his studies, together with a group of friends, he founded the club and gallery of students Pod Ręką. He graduated in 2000 from the atelier of Sławomir Karpowicz.

After graduation, he went to live in Tuscany for seven years. There, he met Silvio Loffredo and Mario Luzi. He lived and worked in Florence and Tizzano until 2009, when he returned to Kraków.

In 2007, his work was noticed by the founder of the Frissiras Museum in Athens, Vlasis Frissiras, who invited Bogumił Książek to participate in the exhibition Eclectic Affinities Among European Artists, presenting contemporary European figuratists, and then showed his work as part of a series of projects implemented by the Frissiras Museum.

In addition to the Athens Frissiras Museum, over the years Bogumił Książek has collaborated with several art institutions, including the A100 Gallery in Galatina, Dominik Rostworowski Gallery and Galeria Olympia in Kraków. His works are in private collections in Italy, Greece, UK and Poland.

In 2015, he obtained Ph.D. in fine arts. He is a lecturer at the Painting Department of the Jan Matejko Academy of Fine Arts in Kraków, where he heads the Interdisciplinary Studio from 2019.

In his work he deals with topics related to the history of art, literature and politics. Sometimes his works are accompanied by literary commentaries (e.g. The Sleeping Agata Duda, 2018; Galeria Olympia). In 2019, he discovered a missing work in his own painting, Young Man Rafael Santi (Significant Dimensions).

In 2024 he received Witold Wojtkiewicz Award for the exhibition Loty in the Ufo Art Gallery.

== Selected works ==
- Bruegel's The Blind Leading the Blind (Ślepcy Bruegla), 2007;
- Diogenes Tries to Count to 10 (Diogenes usiłuje policzyć do 10), 2012;
- The series Views of Marcel Duchamp (Spojrzenia Marcela Duchampa), 2016;
- Doppelganger (Sobowtór), a messianic portrait of Wojciech Jaruzelski, 2017;
- The Sleeping Agata Duda (Śpiąca Agata Duda), 2018;
- The series Youths (Młodziankowie), 2019;
- Confessionals (Konfesjonały), 2019.

== Selected shows ==
- Galeria Młodych, Kraków, 2001;
- Pittura, Noto, Italy, 2005;
- Wizja Lokalna, Galeria Grodzka, Kraków, 2009;
- Una Bella Settimana, Jan Matejko Academy of Fine Arts in Kraków, 2012;
- Transgresja i Nostalgia, Dominik Rostworowski Gallery, Kraków, 2010;
- Bogumił Ksiażek, Galeria Bocheńska, Warszawa, 2014;
- Diogenes i Eneasz, Otwarta Pracownia, Kraków, curated by Michał Hankus, 2014;
- Diogenes und Aeneas, Sandhoffer Galerie, Salzburg, 2015;
- Aprodi, Castello di Acaya, Italy, 2015;
- Mit and vapour, Lisa Norris Gallery, London, 2015;
- Nerium Oleander, Galeria Olympia, Kraków, 2015;
- Duch Duchampa, Galeria Olympia, Kraków, 2016;
- Młodzieniec 80 lat później, Lubiąż Abbey, as a part of SLOT Art Festival, 2019;
- Młodziankowie, Ogniwo Cooperative, as a part of Kraków Art Week KRAKERS, curated by Anna Baranowa, 2019;
- Pizzeria w Epoce Transformacji, 2019, Jan Matejko Academy of Fine Arts in Kraków, curated by Dominik Stanisławski.
- Loty, 2023, Ufo Art Gallery, Kraków.

Source.
