= Dominik Podsiadły =

Polish multidisciplinary visual artist

- Born: 10 December 1967 (age 58)
- Education: Academy of Fine Arts in Wrocław
- Known for: visual arts

Dominik Podsiadły (born 10 December 1967) is a Polish multidisciplinary visual artist, urban activist and independent curator based in Wrocław.

== Biography ==
He spent the first two years of his life in Africa. He has been active in the arts since the 1980s, starting with spontaneous performance activities in the paratheatrical group “Kwartet Horyzontalny” (together with Artur Szczepaniak and Bartłomiej Anczyk). He was also active in the top management of the Orange Alternative, planning its happenings.

From 1991 to 1994, he studied at the Academy of Fine Arts in Wrocław, where he was a member of Konrad Jarodzki's studio. In the 1990s, he co-founded several informal art groups: “Neue Gothik Art”, “Juju House”, and “DDR” (with Dariusz Stawski and Robert B. Lisek). His works have been acquired by the Dolnośląskie Towarzystwo Zachęty Sztuk Pięknych.

In 2014, he developed and launched the concept of an international biennial of digital art for wireless devices (smartphones, tablets, and WiFi routers) in Wrocław, titled “#nfcdab – Komunikacja Bliskiego Zasięgu Uderzenie Sztuki Cyfrowej” (Short-Range Communication: A Digital Art Impact). This biennial has showcased the work of over 80 digital artists from around the world. Since 2018, the “#nfcdab” project has also been implemented in Amsterdam, Valencia, and Düsseldorf.

In 2021 he formally graduated from the Academy of Fine Arts in Wrocław with a bachelor's degree.

== Exhibitions ==
=== Solo exhibitions ===
- Bwana Kubwa, Galeria Piwnice BWA, Wrocław, 2005
- BUSINESS REPLY..., BWA Awangarda, Wrocław, 2011
- Prove You're Not Human, Kraków, 2024

=== With Dariusz Stawski and Robert B. Lisek ===
- 3 dni w Ameryce – prawda i fałsz, Galeria Squat, Academy of Fine Arts in Wrocław, 1994
- In New Off, Galeria Entropia, 1996

=== Group exhibitions ===
- Castle Prague, Prague, 1996
- Tutesall / Chateau de Bourglinster, Luxembourg, 1997
- Transfert Galleria Polacche, Rome, 2008

Source.
