= Galeria Awangarda =

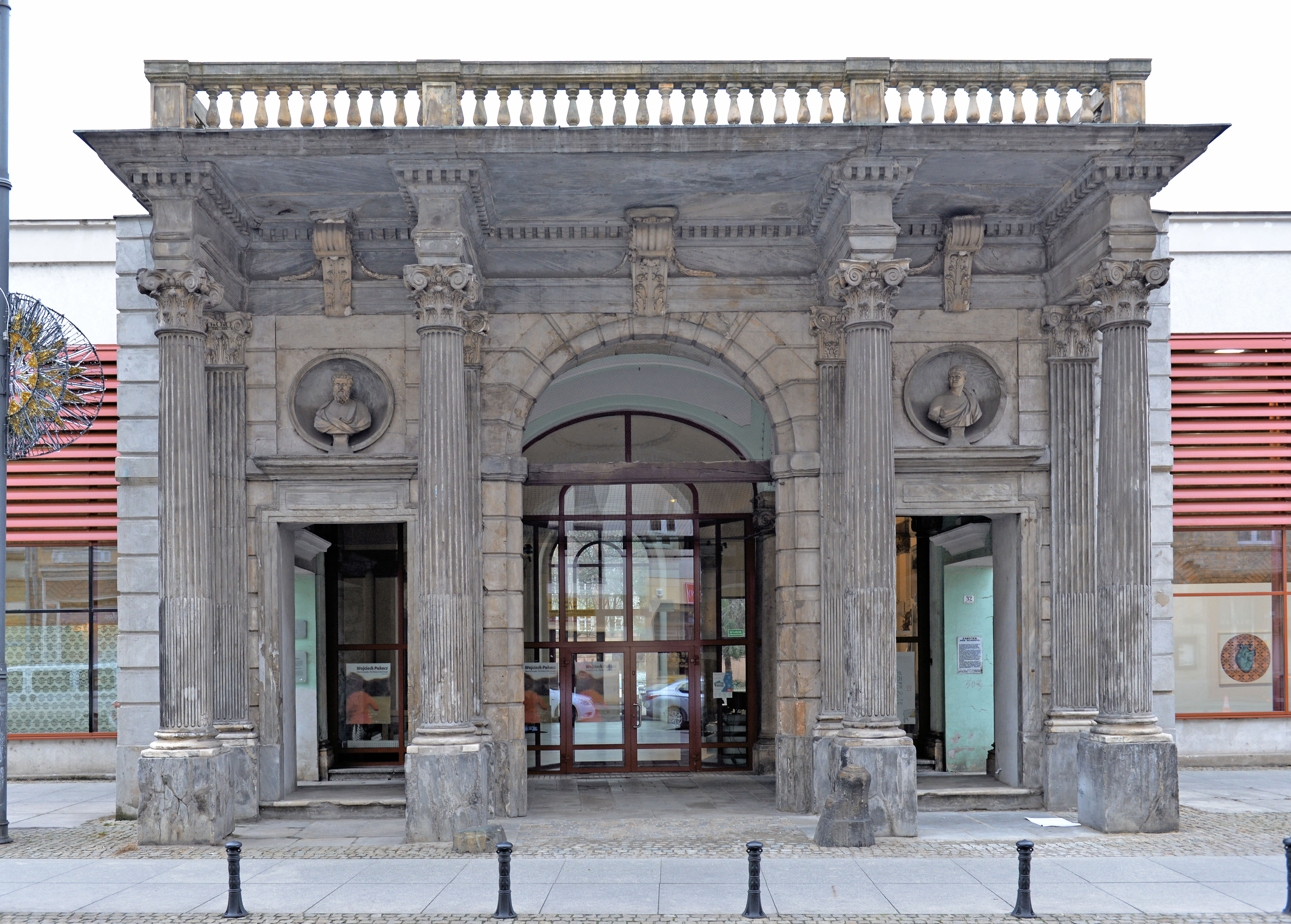
Galeria Awangarda

Galeria Awangarda, 32 Wita Stwosza St, is Wrocław's and Silesia's premier gallery of the avant-garde. It features work by contemporary Polish and European artists. The gallery measures 1000 m squared, Awangarda is the biggest of the BWA galleries, a triumvirate of spaces dedicated to contemporary art (the other two being the Glass and Ceramics Gallery and the Design Gallery). It is housed in the old Hatzfeld Palace, which was virtually destroyed in World War II and has since been maintained though never fully renovated. The gallery is determined to showcase as many artists as possible and has many different many displays during the course of the year from major exhibitions to local degree/diploma shows.

== Exhibitors ==
- Darek Orwat
