= Ufo Art Gallery =

Contemporary art gallery in Kraków, Poland

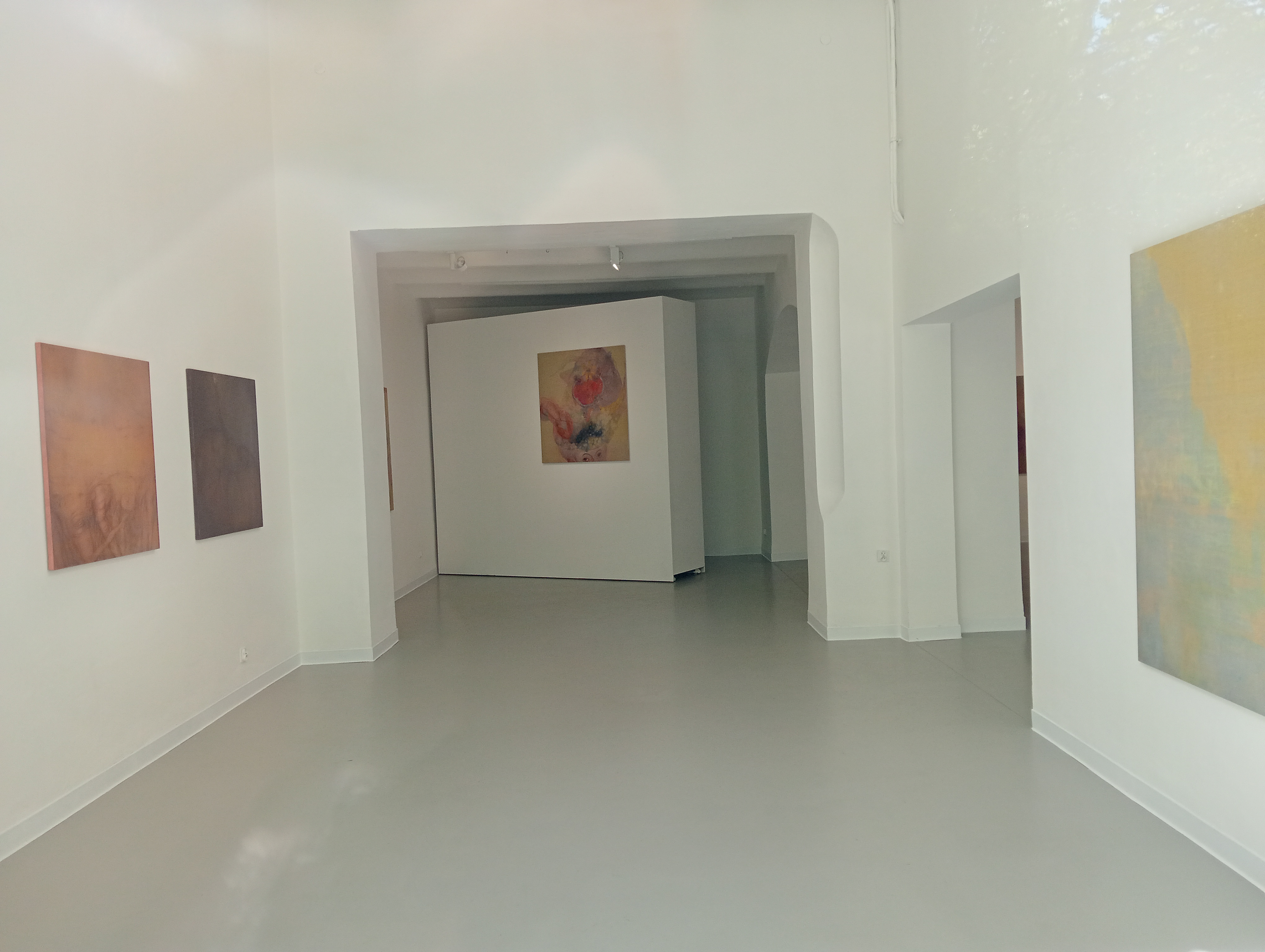
- Ufo Art Gallery, 2026
- Location: Kraków, 6 Podwale Street
- Type: art gallery
- Founder: Maria Ciborowska
- Program director: Maria Ciborowska
- Website: ufoart.gallery

Ufo Art Gallery (Unrecognized Fields Of Art Gallery) is a contemporary art gallery in Kraków, at 6 Podwale Street. It was founded in 2018 by Maria Ciborowska who has been its program director.

The artists who shown their works at the gallery included Marta Antoniak, Michael Biber, Marcin Dymek, Samuel Kłoda, Radim Koros, Bogumił Książek, Grzegorz Siembida, Zuzanna Szary, Agnieszka Szostek and Katarzyna Wyszkowska. A group exhibition Wonderful Line. A sentimental Flight in 2023 included the works by Wilhelm Sasnal, Rafał Bujnowski and Marcin Maciejowski of Ładnie group.

In 2022, in cooperation with 1891 Garni Hotel, the gallery organized four simultaneous painting exhibitions entitled Krakowski spleen. The gallery was represented at the Kraków Art Fair in 2024. In 2024 Bogumił Książek received Witold Wojtkiewicz Award for the exhibition Loty shown in 2023 in the Ufo Art Gallery.
