= Arkadiusz Półtorak =

Polish art critic and curator

- Education: Jagiellonian University
- Occupations: cultural studies scholar, curator, art critic

Arkadiusz Półtorak is a cultural studies scholar, curator, and critic of visual and performing arts, assistant professor at the Department of Performance Studies, Jagiellonian University.

== Biography ==
In 2015 he obtained the scholarship of the Ministry of Science and Higher Education. Between 2015 and 2020 he was a holder of the ministerial “Diamond Grant” program. In 2016 he graduated in Polish philology from the Jagiellonian University. In 2018 he graduated from De Appel Curatorial Programme in Amsterdam. In 2021 he obtained doctorate in cultural and religious studies from the Jagiellonian University.

He has collaborated with, among others, the CSW Zamek Ujazdowski and the Studio Gallery in Warsaw, the Arsenał Gallery in Białystok and the curated_by festival in Vienna (together with Goschka Gawlik). In 2016 together with Leona Jacewska and Martyna Nowicka-Wojnowska he co-founded the independent space for contemporary art and music „Elementarz dla mieszkańców miast” in Kraków. He has been the President of the Polish Section of International Association of Art Critics (AICA) from 2023. In 2020–2023 he served as its Secretary-General. He worked at the Institute of Media Arts, Pedagogical University of Kraków between 2019 and 2021. Since 2022, he has been the supervisor of the Jagiellonian University's Performance Studies Students' Scientific Circle. In 2024, he became a member of the Board of Muzeum Sztuki in Łódź and the jury of the Jerzy Stajuda Art Criticism Award.

His research interests include the connections between contemporary artistic and curatorial practices and activism, political thought, and cultural policy; his research focuses particularly on practices under the banner of so-called new or experimental institutionalism. He published, among others, in Szum and Dwutygodnik.

Together with Łucja Iwanczewska, he has co-organized conferences in the “Performatyka. Poza kanonem” series since 2022 and co-edited two publications in the series under the same title at Wiele Kropek Publishing House.

He lives in Kraków.

== Books ==
- Konkretne abstrakcje. Taktyki i strategie afirmatywne w sztuce współczesnej. Warszawa: Instytut Badań Literackich Polskiej Akademii Nauk. 2020.
