= Ewa Ciepielewska =

Polish artist

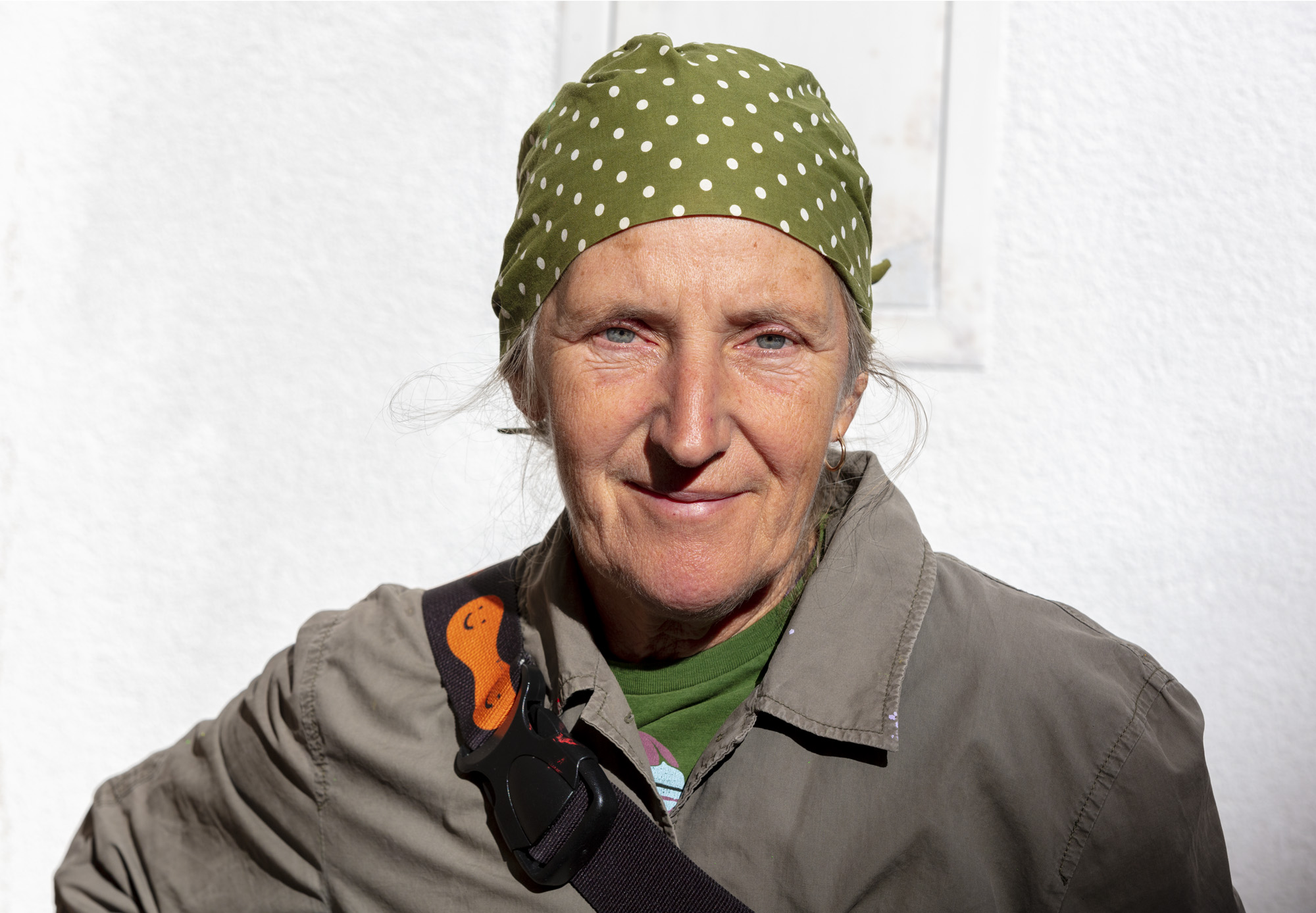
- Born: October 1, 1960 (age 65); Wałbrzych, Poland
- Known for: painting, performance, activism

Ewa Ciepielewska (born 1 October 1960) is a Polish painter, performance artist and an activist.

== Early life and education ==
Ewa Ciepielewska was born on 1 October 1960, in Wałbrzych, Poland. In 1984 she completed her studies in painting at the Higher School of Fine Arts in Wrocław, at the studio of prof. Konrad Jarodzki.

== Career ==
In 1982, together with Bożena Grzyb-Jarodzka and Paweł Jarodzki, Ewa Ciepielewska co-founded the artistic group LUXUS in Wrocław. Over the years, she participated in dozens of exhibitions of the group and co-created the LUXUS Magazine and other publications of the group. Together with Magdalena Mosiewicz, she co-organized the Lotny Festiwal poza Murami festival. In the second half of the 1990s, she established the Volans association, whose aim is to support young art.

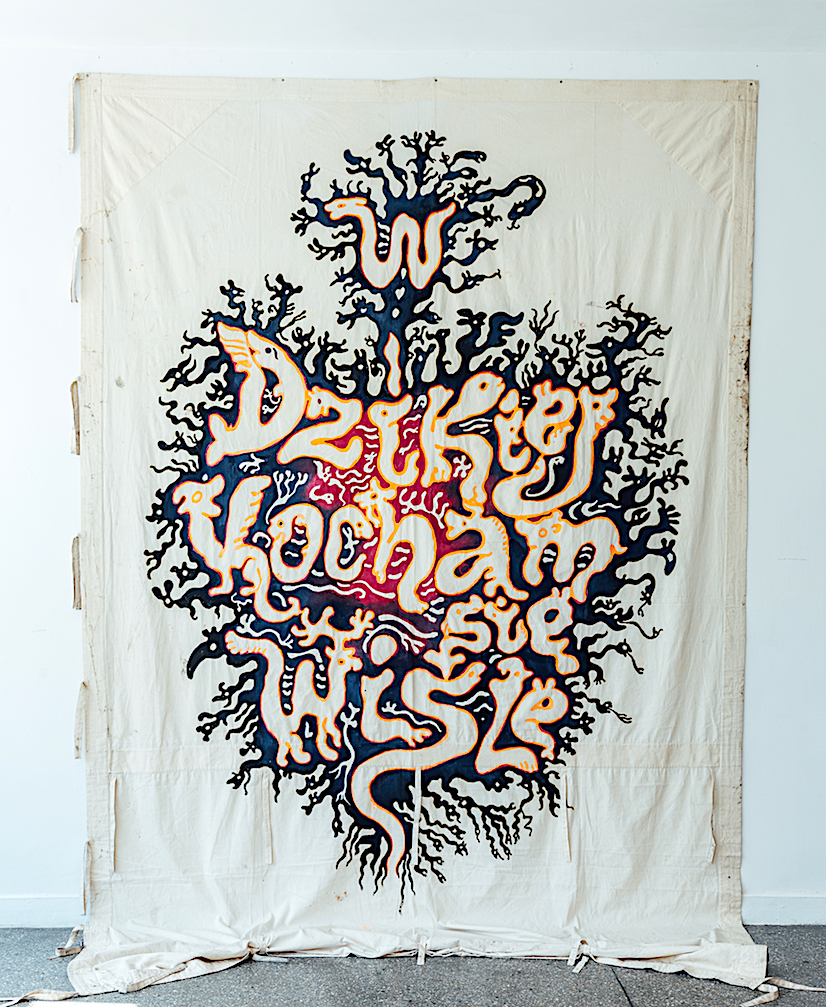
W dzikiej kocham się Wiśle ("I'm in love with wild Vistula"), work by Ciepielewska

She combines her artistic work with pro-ecological and political activities. In addition to painting, she also creates engaged happenings, murals and outdoor projects. She belongs to Koalicja Ratujmy Rzeki (Save the Rivers Coalition). Since the beginning of the 21st century, she has been engaging in projects connected to the Vistula river, which resulted in the Flow/Przepływ project (since 2015) aimed to use art as the means of looking after the aquatic ecosystem. The project included art residencies on the Vistula for artists, curators and activists. The results were presented at exhibitions, for example at the Hamburger Bahnhof (2018) and Alter Hafen in Berlin (2017), or at the Gdańsk City Gallery (2016, 2018).

Her works have appeared at individual and group exhibitions, including at the National Museum in Gdańsk, the Łaźnia Centre for Contemporary Art, the Museum of Modern Art in Warsaw, the Zachęta National Gallery of Art, the Ujazdowski Castle Center for Contemporary Art and Strykejernet in Oslo. Ciepielewska's works are part of the collections of the National Museums in Warsaw, Wrocław and Kraków, as well as the Jerke Museum in Recklinghausen.

== Awards ==
- 2020: Order Rzeki Wisły – a rafting community award
- 2020: Katarzyna Kobro Award for 2019
- 2022: Allegro Prize
