= Wojciech Ćwiertniewicz =

Polish painter (born 1955)

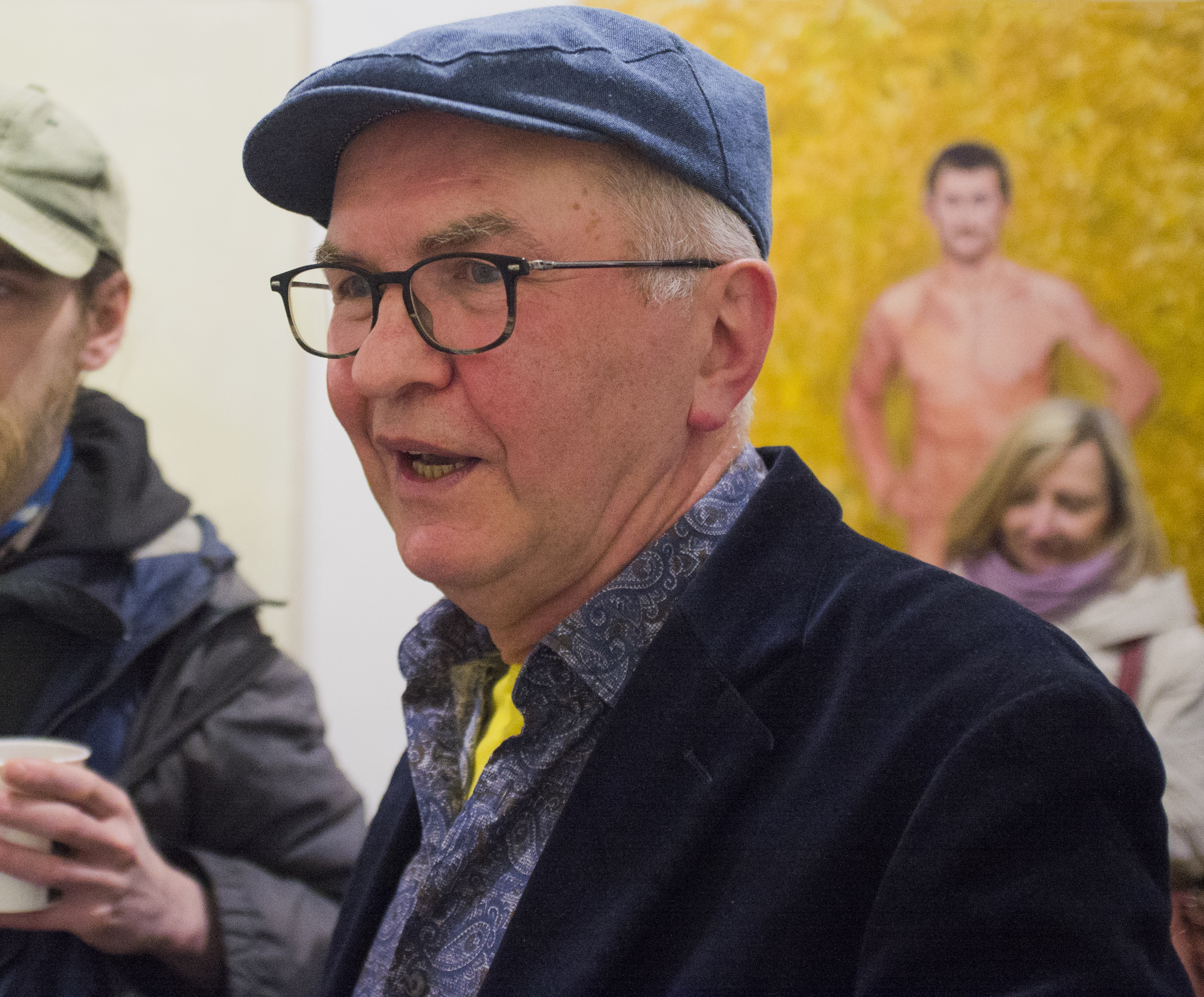
- Wojciech Ćwiertniewicz, 2023
- Born: March 26, 1955 (age 71); Krościenko nad Dunajcem
- Education: Jan Matejko Academy of Fine Arts
- Known for: painting

Wojciech Ćwiertniewicz (born 26 March 1955) is a Polish painter.

== Biography ==
He studied painting at the Academy of Fine Arts in Kraków from 1976 to 1981, graduating from the studio of Włodzimierz Buczek. He is the recipient of awards including the Cyprian Kamil Norwid Art Criticism Award (1987) and the Exit Award (2008). He lives and works in Kraków.

He does not give his paintings titles, only numbers. His works are in several public collections, including the National Museum in Kraków, the Upper Silesian Museum in Bytom, and the Main Library of the Academy of Fine Arts in Kraków. He has held more than sixty solo painting exhibitions and participated in over one hundred group exhibitions. He has published seven volumes of journals: A Painter's Journal (published by the Otwarta Pracownia Artistic Association, Kraków 2002), Untitled (Kraków 2004), Długa Street (Kraków 2005), Untitled 2 (Kraków 2006), Year 2006 (Kraków 2007), 2007 (Kraków 2008), and 2008 (Kraków 2009).

== Bibliography ==
- "Paintings of Wojciech Ćwiertniewicz". agraart.pl. Archived from the original on 13 April 2015.
- "Wojciech Ćwiertniewicz Gallery". cwiertniewicz.republika.pl. Archived from the original on 14 March 2012.
- Lewandowski, Roman (2007). "Nowe życie aktów (trumiennych)". Archived from the original on 6 March 2016.
- Leszkowicz, Paweł. "Mężczyźni Wojciecha Ćwiertniewicza; Atak męskim ciałem w warszawskiej galerii aTak". obieg.pl.
- Markowska, Anna. "Wojciech Ćwiertniewicz. Not a Day without a Line". kwartalnik.exit.art.pl. Archived from the original on 6 March 2016.
- Markowska, Anna. "Kolejny tom". kwartalnik.exit.art.pl.
- Małkowska, Monika. "Nadzy i niewinni". zw.com.pl. Archived from the original on 4 March 2016.
