= Kijewski / Kocur =

Artist duo

Marek Kijewski and Małgorzata Malinowska, Polish artists, were cooperating since 1996 as Kijewski/Kocur duo in Warsaw, Poland. They often worked in the studios of the Centre of Polish Sculpture until the artist's death in 2007. Their works, in Polish art, was inspired by pop art and it showed the most distinct example of using pop art in the era of post-modernist experiments and reactions to the new reality and new economic-cultural situation that was forming in Poland in the early '90s.

In Kijewski/Kocur works, since 1996, they fulfilled and inspired each other. By using an original and self-imposed strategy called SSS – surfing, scanning, and sampling, They freely explored different aspects of contemporary visual culture. Kijewski / Kocur were creating eye-catching collages and spatial forms out of unusual materials like Lego bricks, Haribo sweets, artificial fur, feathers, neon tubes, precious stones and 24-karat gold. They were assembling different valued materials, things commonly defined as „high value” with what is „low value”, crossing without embarrassing the boundaries between cultural orders, by constructing wild aesthetically-semantic hybrids.

== Marek Kijewski (Kijewski) ==
Marek Kijewski (1955–2007). He was a student of Academy of Fine Arts in Warsaw between 1981 and 1985. He graduated in sculpture in the class of Professor Jerzy Jarnuszkiewicz. Between 1985 and 1987, he was a member of the Neue Bieriemiennost group with Miroslaw Bałka and Miroslaw Filonik. In the mid-1990s Kijowski became more interested in including contemporary visual culture, mainly mass culture into his works. He began using completely non-artistic materials in his pieces which were often everyday objects.

== Małgorzata Malinowska (Kocur) ==
Małgorzata Malinowska (1959–2016) in Sopot. Malinowska studied painting at the State Higher School of Visual Arts in Gdańsk, where she received a diploma in 1986 from the Faculty of Painting, Graphic Art and Sculpture.

Gdańsk artistic environment led Małgorzata Malinowska to paint works which differed in presenting human figures, mainly by using vivid colors. But later on, she abandoned painting and moved to Warsaw, where she worked under her professional name “Kocur”. These changes made Kijewski close to figurative art again.

== Selected solo exhibitions ==
2018

Kijewski/Kocur, Gdansk City Gallery, Gdansk / Poland

2015

Golden Shot, Propaganda, Warsaw / Poland

2014

Billion and One, Propaganda, Warsaw / Poland

2008

I'm All A-tremble When I Can Shower You with Gold, CCA Ujazdowski Castle, Warsaw / Poland

2005

Three Triptychs +..., CCA Łaźnia, Gdańsk / Poland

200

Marek Kijewski, Fabryka Trzciny Art Center, Warsaw / Poland

Graces, AT Gallery, Poznań / Poland

2003

Three Triptychs +..., Arsenał Municipal Gallery, Poznań / Poland

ars@pl, Polish Institute, Rome / Poland

2001

Icons, Cameral Gallery, Słupsk / Poland

Continuum, Studio Bayer, Warsaw / Poland

Gates@pl, CCA Ujazdowski Castle, Warsaw / Poland

2000

Bit Idol Sant, Arsenał Gallery, Białystok / Poland

Idolls, Manhattan Gallery, Łódź / Poland

1999

Idolls, Sektor I Gallery, Katowice / Poland

1998

Core, Centre of Polish Sculpture, Orońsko / Poland, Orońsko;

Core, Provincial Gallery, Słubice / Poland

Core, Amfilada Gallery, Szczecin / Poland

1997

SSS (sensitive), Arsenał Municipal Gallery, Poznań / Poland

[Choco-surfing], Biała Gallery, Lublin / Poland

Sensitive, Gallery of the Old Town Hall, Gdańsk / Poland

1996

Sensitive, Galeria Zderzak, Kraków / Poland

Sensitive, Arsenał Gallery, Białystok / Poland

== Selected group exhibitions ==
2017

140 Beats per Minute. Rave Culture and Art in 1990s Poland, Museum of Modern Art, Warsaw / Poland

2016

Works from the Art Collection of Galeria Bielska BWA, Bielska Gallery BWA, Bielsko-Biała / Poland

Orońsko. 17 km as the Crow Flies, Mazovian Centre of Contemporary Art "Elektrownia", Radom / Poland

"The Touch, BWA Municipal Gallery, Bydgoszcz / Poland

2015

"The Touch, UP Gallery, Berlin / Germany

Zbigniew Libera: It's Not My Fault That This Sculpture Rubbed Against Me, Xawery Dunikowski Museum of Sculpture "Królikarnia", Warsaw / Poland

The Touch, Centre of Polish Sculpture, Orońsko / Poland

2014

Adoration of Sweetness, Zachęta – National Gallery of Art, Warsaw / Poland

In Between, Propaganda, Warsaw / Poland

Left Hemisphere, Propaganda, Warsaw / Poland

2013

Small Is Big, Propaganda, Warsaw / Poland

2009

Like a Rolling Stone 2, Appendix2 gallery, Warsaw / Poland

Bifurcations, Appendix2 gallery, Warsaw / Poland

2008

Bifurcations, Centre of Polish Sculpture, Orońsko / Poland

2007

Demos Kratos – Power of the People, BWA Bielska Gallery, Bielsko-Biała / Poland

2006

Demos Kratos – Power of the People, Klima Bocheńska Gallery, Warsaw / Poland

2005

UN/REAL?, Wyspa Art Institute, Gdańsk / Poland

2004

9th Sculpture Quadrennial, Riga / Latvia

Friends of the Rabbit. Animals and Sculpture from the 18th Century to Present, National Museum, Szczecin / Poland

2003

Friends of the Rabbit. Animals and Sculpture from the 18th Century to Present, X. Dunikowski Sculpture Museum, Warsaw / Poland

Neuropa, XXI Gallery, Warsaw / Poland

Liberté! Sans responsabilité!? Oui!? Non!?, Est-Ouest Festival, Die / France

Contemporary Art for All Children, Zachęta – National Gallery of Art, Warsaw / Poland

2002

A Method of Living, CCA Łażnia, Gdańsk / Poland

Semiotic Landscape, X. Dunikowski Sculpture Museum, Warsaw / Poland

Semiotic Landscape, Charim Galerie, Vienna / Austria

Power of the People, Arsenał Gallery, Białystok / Poland

Aporie, BWA Zielona Góra, Zielona Góra / Poland

2001

International Contemporary Art Collection, CCA Ujazdowski Castle, Warsaw / Poland

4 x kunst aus Polen, Kabinett Museum Junge Kunst, Frankfurt (Oder) / Germany

Kolmo K’ose, Dům umění, Opava / Czech Republic

Irreligia. Morfologie du non-sacré dans l’art polonais du XXe siècle, Atelier 340 Muzeum, Brussels / Belgium

Ab Ovo, Centre of Polish Sculpture, Orońsko / Poland

2000

Scene 2000. National Art Exhibition, CCA Ujazdowski Castle, Warsaw / Poland

In freiheit / endlich. Polnische Kunst nach 1989, Staatliche Kunsthalle, Baden-Baden / Germany

Transmissions, DRAC Alsace, Palais du Rhin, Strasbourg / France

Free/Finally. Polish Art After 1989, X. Dunikowski Sculpture Museum, Warsaw / Poland

Utopia and Vision. Sculpture and Installations in the Public Sphere, Zachęta – National Gallery of Art, Warsaw / Poland

1999

Utopia and Vision. Sculpture and Installations in the Public Sphere, Centre of Polish Sculpture, Orońsko / Poland

Toyama Now ’99. Internal/External. The Seventh International Contemporary Art Exhibition. Poland – Japan, The Museum of Modern Art, Toyama / Japan

Generations. Polish Art at the End/Turn of the Century, Central Exhibition Salon Maneż, Sankt Petersburg / Russia

Baroque and Present – Lost Paradise, Slovenska Národna Galéria, Bratislava / SlovakiaFigure in Polish Sculpture of the 19th and 20th Centuries, Centre of Polish Sculpture, Orońsko / Poland

1998

Transfer Polska. Nordhein-Westfallen, Von der Heydt-Museum, Wuppertal

Transfer Polska. Nordhein-Westfallen, Art Bunker Gallery, Cracow / Poland

Transfer Polska. Nordhein-Westfallen, X. Dunikowski Sculpture Museum, Warsaw / Poland

1997

The Collection of Contemporary Art for the 1000th Anniversary of Gdańsk, CCA Łaźnia, Gdańsk / Poland

Transformator of Emotions in Polish Art of the 90’s, Budapest Galéria, Budapest / Hungary

3rd Biennial in Cetinje, Cetinje / Montenegro

1996

Collection 3, CCA Ujazdowski Castle, Warsaw / Poland
