= Labyrinth Gallery =

Contemporary art gallery in Lublin, Poland

Coordinates: 51°15′10″N 22°32′28″E

Galeria Labirynt was established in 1956 as the Bureau of Artistic Exhibitions (Polish: Biuro Wystaw Artystycznych or Polish: BWA) in Lublin, Poland. It presents a variety of art disciplines including installations, video art, performance art, multimedia, photography, film, art, building, painting, and drawing.

== History ==
Galeria Labirynt was founded in 1956 as the BWA. In 1981 Andrzej Mroczek became the director of BWA. In the gallery he continued to pursue the first program that he had led since 1974. Galeria Labirynt promoted contemporary art, focusing on the formal experiment.

BWA gained nationwide and worldwide recognition as an artists’ meeting place. After the introduction of martial law in Poland, BWA was one of the few government institutions not under a boycott. This was evidence of the trust that independent Polish artistic milieus had for the director, Andrzej Mroczek.

In 2010 Waldemar Tatarczuk became the new director of BWA. Similar to Andrzej Mroczek, he added his ideas of a Performance Art Centre, run by him in the years 1999 – 2010, to the gallery's program. Tatarczuk changed the name of the gallery from BWA to Galeria Labirynt. The name in English means Labyrinth Gallery.

As of 2012, Galeria Labirynt mainly follows the path established by Andrzej Mroczek — presenting the classics of contemporary art and works of the artists linked with his program, taking an in-depth look at present day works of art, and searching for universal values in art.

== Artists ==
Polish artists whose work was presented in the Labyrinth Gallery include: Cezary Bodzianowski, Janusz Baldyga, Miroslaw Balka, Basia Bańda, George Beres, Hubert Czerepok, Maurice Gomulicki, Gruppa, Michał Iwański, Marek Kijewski, Circle Klipsa, Marek Konieczny, Zofia Kulik, Przemyslaw Kwiek, Elzbieta Jablonska, Zbigniew Libera, Natalia LL, Maria Pinińska-Beres, Zygmunt Piotrowski, Joseph Robakowski, Jan Swidzinski, Iza Tarasewicz, Zbigniew Warpechowski, and Krzysztof Zarebski.

The non-Polish artists whose work was presented in the Labyrinth Gallery include: Stuart Brisley, Michael Snow, Dick Higgins, Joseph Beuys, and Christo.
