= Galeria Bielska BWA =

Coordinates: 49°49′29″N 19°2′40.5″E

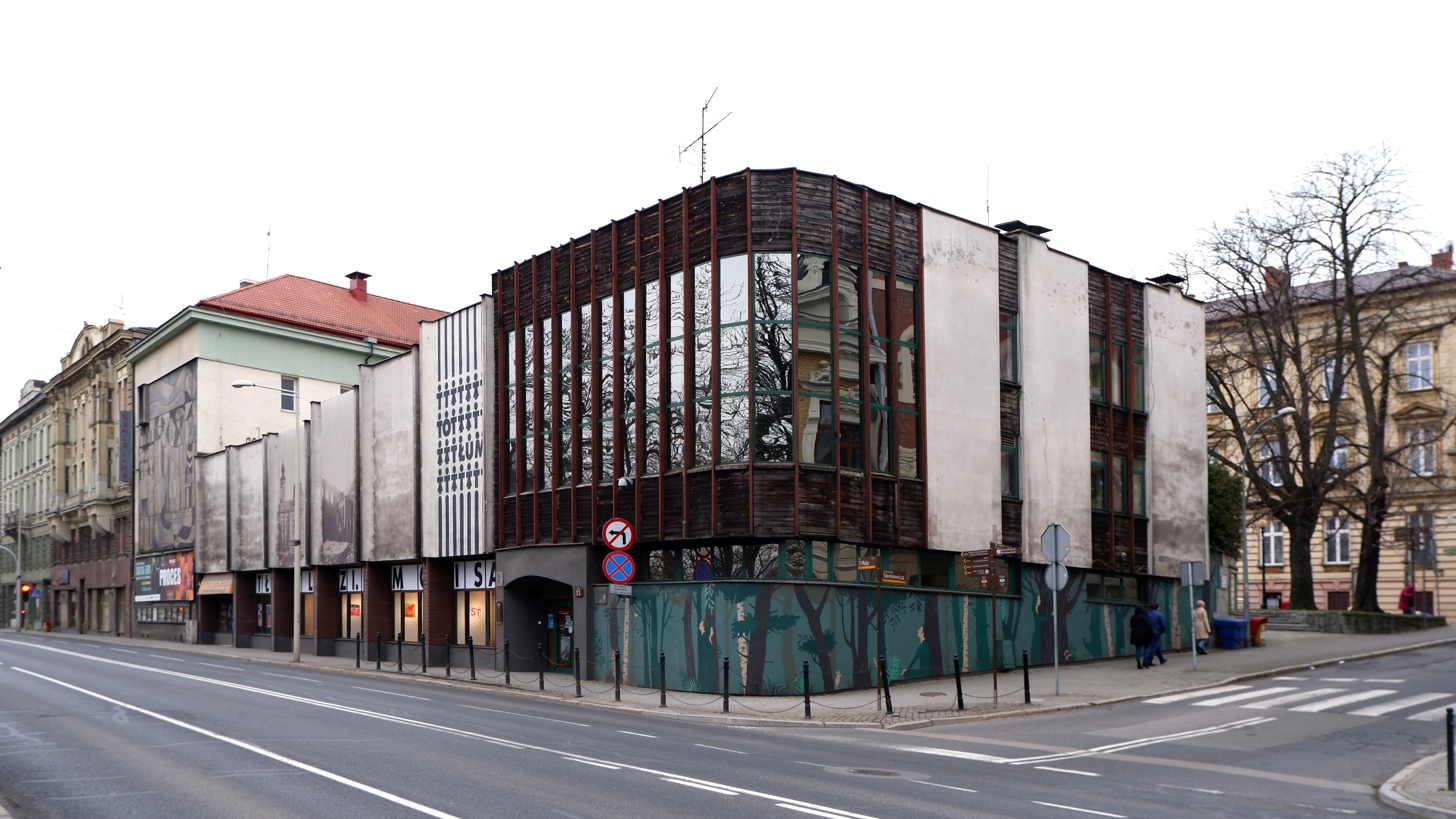
Main building of Galeria Bielska BWA

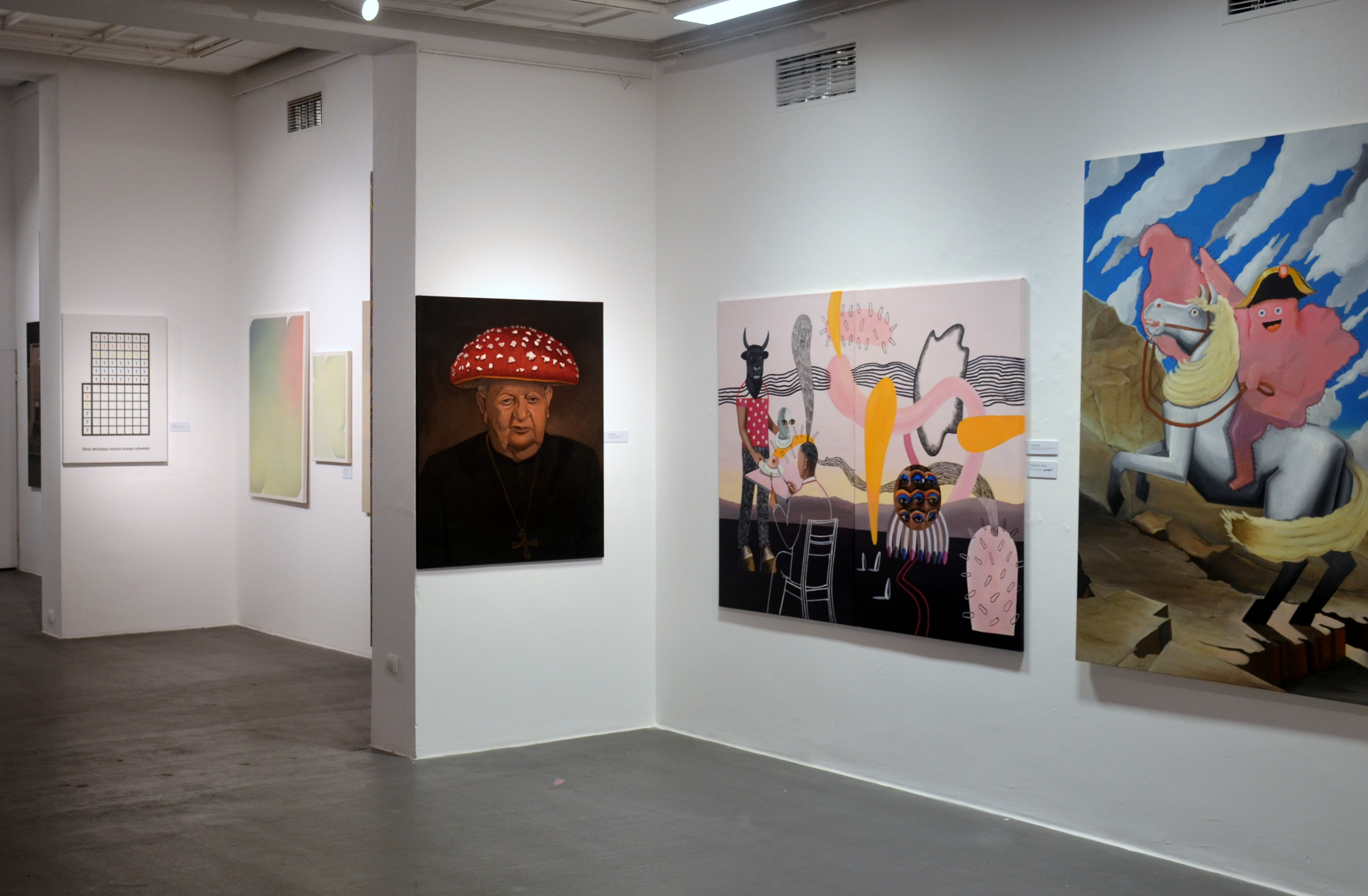
45th Painting Biennale Bielsko Autumn (2021)

Galeria Bielska BWA is a municipal art gallery of Bielsko-Biała, Poland, dedicated to the contemporary art. It carries out exhibition, publishing, documentary and educational activities. It is the organiser of the Painting Biennale Bielsko Autumn (Bielska Jesień) and the Bielsko-Biała Visual Arts Festival (Bielski Festiwal Sztuk Wizualnych).

The main seat of the gallery is the building at 11, 3 Maja Street. It was built in 1960 as the Pavilion of the Visual Artists (Pawilon Plastyków) in the place of the Bielsko Synagogue destroyed by Nazis. The Pavilion hosted exhibitions of the local branch of the Association of Polish Artists and Designers. Between 1970 and 1975, it housed a branch of the Katowice Art Exhibition Office (Biuro Wystaw Artystycznych, abbreviated as BWA), which was transformed into an independent institution after the establishment of the Bielsko-Biała Voivodeship. In 1989, the building was expanded to its present form, with a second floor with a new exhibition hall (currently there are two with a total area of 400 m^{2}), a café with a glass corner elevation (currently the Aquarium clubhouse), new offices and warehouses. In 1994, the facility was taken over by the local government of Bielsko-Biała and was given its current name. Since 2020, the gallery has also used rooms in the historic villa of Theodor Sixt (at 24 Mickiewicza Street), where e.g. an exhibition of selected works from the permanent collection is presented, which totals (as of January 2022) 1,073 works.
