= Conrad Festival =

Literary festival in Poland

Joseph Conrad International Festival of Literature Międzynarodowy Festiwal Literatury im. Josepha Conrada
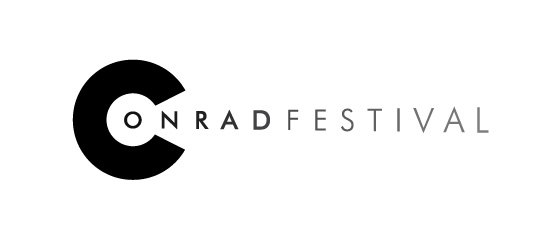
- Nickname: Conrad Festival
- Status: Active
- Genre: Literary festival
- Frequency: Annually
- Location: Kraków
- Country: Poland
- Years active: 17
- Most recent: October 29, 2023
- Sponsor: Tygodnik Powszechny
- Website: en.conradfestival.pl

The Conrad Festival is an annual literary festival held in Kraków since 2009. It is organised by the Tygodnik Powszechny Foundation and the Kraków Festival Office and is supported by the Kraków Municipal Government and Poland's Ministry of Culture and National Heritage. It is the largest literary festival in Central Europe and was named after Polish-British novelist Joseph Conrad.

The festival hosts artists from around the world, the representatives of various cultures and worldviews, who create not only literature, but also film, theatre, music and the visual arts. Each year, it accompanies the Kraków Book Fair. Unlike other Polish events that deal mostly with Polish literature, the Conrad Festival is intended to be a festival on an international level. Its many illustrious guests have included: recipients of the Nobel Prize in Literature Herta Müller and Orhan Pamuk, Marjane Satrapi, Amos Oz, Rabih Alameddine, Claude Lanzmann, Yurii Andrukhovych, David Grossman, Paul Auster, László Krasznahorkai, Alberto Manguel, Boris Akunin, Alain Mabanckou, Dubravka Ugrešić, Magdalena Tulli, Andrzej Stasiuk, Jerzy Pilch, and Olga Tokarczuk.

== Programme council ==
The festival's artistic director was Michał Paweł Markowski a literary critic, publicist and professor at the Jagiellonian University and the University of Illinois at Chicago. Its programme director was Grzegorz Jankowicz of Tygodnik Powszechny. In 2024 it was announced that Markowski and Jankowicz would be replaced by Urszula Chwalba and Olga Drenda respectively.

== Festival concept ==
The concept of the Conrad Festival is based on two principles. Each day of the festival is devoted to a separate phenomena related to literature. The culmination of each day is a meeting with a foreign writer as well as many related events.

== Conrad Award ==
Starting with the seventh edition of the Conrad Festival in 2015, the Conrad Award (whose monetary worth is 30,000 zloty) will be given. This prize will be awarded for debut books published in the previous year in Poland by up-and-coming writers. The city of Kraków is the main sponsor of this award, in partnership with the Book Institute, Tygodnik Powszechny Foundation and Kraków Festival Office. Nominations for this award are put forward by readers and publishing houses.
