= Leadel.net =

Leadel.net, also known as Leadel, was a Jewish Media Hub that focused on Jewish identity in the 21st century using digital and new media efforts. The organization ceased activity around 2015; its website shows no archived activity after 2014, and a February 2015 article in eJewishPhilanthropy covering its final known event made no mention of future programming.

== History ==
Launched in September 2008, Leadel (also, Leadel.NET) was founded by the President of the European Jewish Congress, Moshe Kantor. Leadel was created to provide a new-age, Web 2.0 based media portal to young Jewish professionals from around the world to connect generations, interact and find inspiration.

What began as a journalistic approach with one-on-one interviews with prominent Jews such as Natan Sharansky, Alan Dershowitz, and Bernard-Henri Lévy led to live interactive events both on site locations and on the Web to connect and inspire Diaspora communities, Jewish professionals, and Israel to each other.

== Elements ==
The name Leadel originated from “Leadership Elements” and has active contents providing information and services to the global Jewish community.

=== Video spotlights ===
Leadel spotlights are collections of interviews, short mini series, and educational videos that show the variety of Judaism and Jewish identity in the 21st century.

=== Shevet Achim ===
Shevet Achim is a joint initiative and project between the offices of Yuli Edelstein, Israeli Minister of Diaspora Affairs, and the European Jewish Congress.

Shevet Achim provides alternative, accessible means of communication between Jewish Diaspora communities and leading Israeli government officials. Each event uses video conferencing and Webcast technology to create bridges across geographical borders.

=== Leadel 7 ===
Leadel 7 was a mini WebTV series or collection of Webisodes produced in 2009-2010 spotlighting hip Jewish topics on the Web. All Leadel 7 episodes and project were produced in conjunction with the Sammy Ofer School of Communications at The Interdisciplinary Center(IDC) located in Herzliya, Israel.

=== Leadel Live ===
Live events took place approximately every other month using Internet based Webcasting as an access and distribution tool for interaction. Content discussed current media issues and topics ranging from Israeli media to Iran to Jewish perspective.

=== Leadel EDU ===
Leadel EDU was a platform that provided Jewish educational content for teachers and educators to enrich programming about Jewish identity and Israel in the 21st century.

=== Leadel Blog ===
The Leadel Blog was ongoing written coverage of global Jewish events, ideas and Web happenings.

== Funding ==
Leadel was a project of the European Jewish Congress and funded by the European Jewish Fund(EJF).
