= Union of Jewish Religious Communities in Poland =

- Administrative division of ZGWŻ across Poland
- Abbreviation: ZGWŻ
- Predecessor: Związek Religijny Wyznania Mojżeszowego, registered in 1949
- Formation: February 27, 1997; 29 years ago originally registered in 1993
- Type: NGO
- Legal status: Religious community
- Headquarters: Warsaw
- Members: ~ 2,000 (1998)
- Official language: Polish
- Leader: Piotr Kadlčik (2003-)

The Union of Jewish Religious Communities in Poland (Polish: Związek Gmin Wyznaniowych Żydowskich w Rzeczpospolitej Polskiej, ZGWŻ), is a religious association formed by Jews living in Poland who adhere to Judaism. It was originally created in 1949 as the Religious Association of Judaism, and renamed in 1992. The Association's seat is located in Warsaw, with seven administrative branches throughout the country. ZGWŻ consists of approximately 2,000 members (1998) congregating in nine municipalities. The Union operates seven active synagogues and 15 prayer houses. Also, ZGWŻ publishes its own periodicals, as well as the popular Jewish Calendar (Kalendarz Żydowski). Since 2003, the president of the Union is Piotr Kadlčik.

== Activities ==
The main goal of the Association is to organize religious and cultural life for its members. The Association continues the democratic traditions of the Jewish religious presence in the country preceding the Holocaust and the subsequent religious strife in Soviet-dominated Poland from before the Revolutions of 1989. The Jewish community was almost completely destroyed in World War II, along with most of its religious monuments. ZGWŻ helps Polish Jews - including the descendants of the Holocaust survivors - in a variety of legal matters, both communal and personal, including aiding in the process of recovery and restoration of property once owned by the Jewish Kehilla (קהלה), and nationalized in Communist Poland, like the White Stork Synagogue in Wrocław (see gallery).

ZGWŻ activities are financed by the resources of the union, and in part, by grants from the Joint Distribution Committee (JDC). Some specific projects are also supported financially by the Ministry of Culture, the Arts of Poland, and other private sponsors.

The Union maintains all active synagogues, prayer houses, and historical cemeteries. It oversees the organization of ritual dining, slaughter of animals, distribution of kosher food, and communal baths. The Association also maintains specialized religious groups (such as the "burial brotherhood"), and manages its own health care resources and social support networks. It is a partner with many state institutions and non-governmental organizations (NGO's), working toward the preservation and promotion of the Jewish heritage in Poland. It also takes an active role in the preservation of Jewish historical monuments that are considered a part of the national heritage of Poland. The Association also runs language schools, and organizes educational courses, lectures, seminars, conferences, and training sessions, and publishes its own magazines and books.

== Organization ==
The Union of Jewish Communities in Poland was officially registered in 1993, although at present it operates under the (later) Act of Polish Parliament "Dziennik Ustaw No. 41 par. 251", signed on February 27, 1997. It is a legal continuation of the Religious Union of Judaism (Związek Religijny Wyznania Mojżeszowego), which was established in 1946. The Association is composed of eight Jewish municipalities, including Warsaw, Wrocław, Kraków, Łódź, Szczecin, Katowice, Bielsko-Biała, and Legnica. All smaller Jewish communities are subordinate to the branch offices of the Association.

ZGWŻ brings together all adults of the Jewish faith along with people of Jewish nationality and origin who are not following any other religions, but who own Polish citizenship (or simply reside in Poland). The Chairman of the Association, who was elected in October 2003, is its former vice-president, Piotr Kadlčik. Union representatives sit on the Board of Directors of several Jewish organizations, including the European Jewish Congress, the European Jewish Fund, the Foundation for the Preservation of Jewish Heritage in Poland, the American Jewish Committee (AJC), the National Council for Revindication Agreements in Poland, and the World Federation of Polish Jews.

Pictures of synagogues managed by ZGWŻ
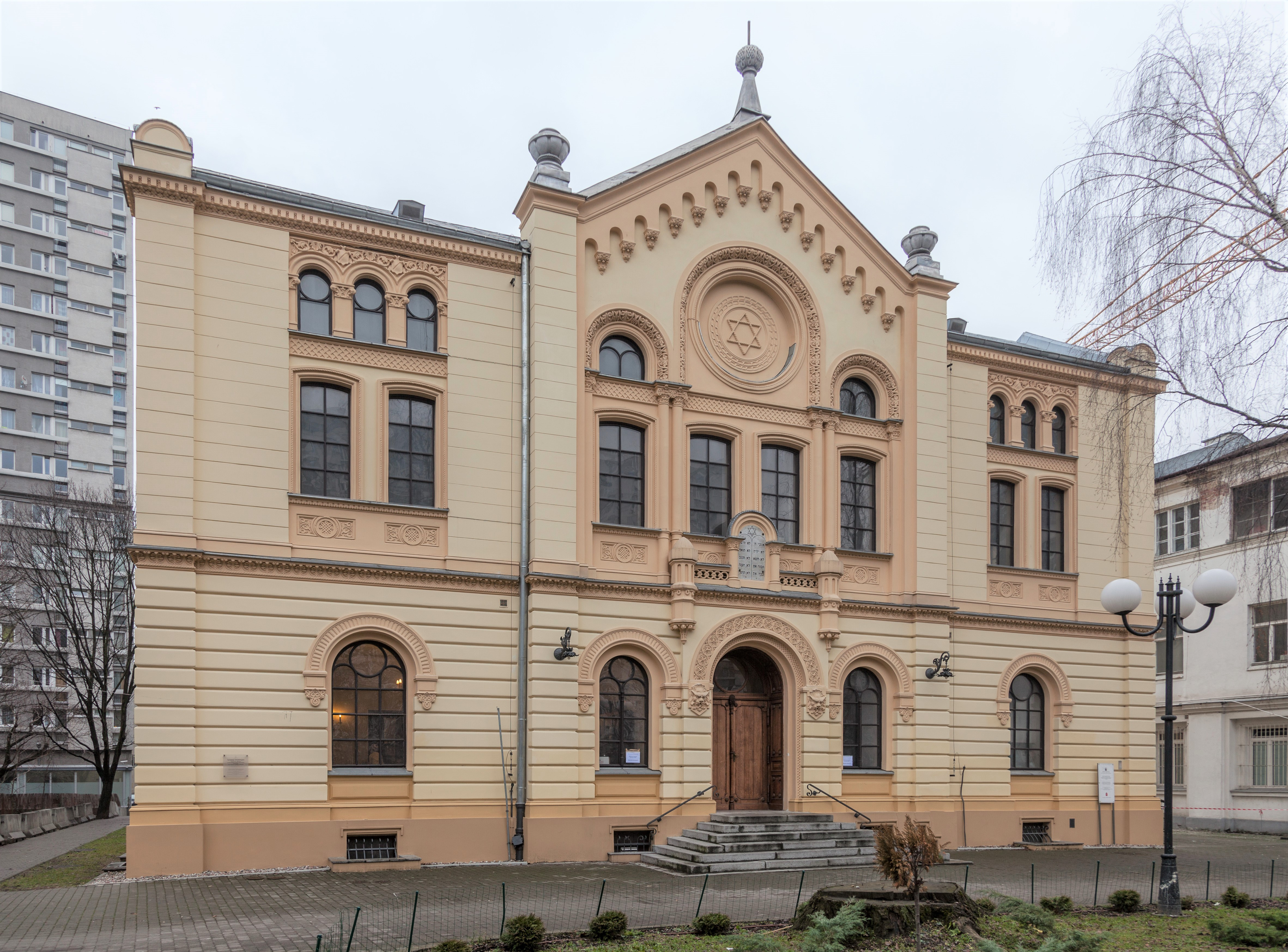
Nożyk Synagogue, Warsaw

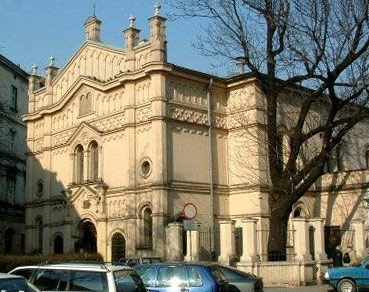
Tempel Synagogue in Kraków, exterior

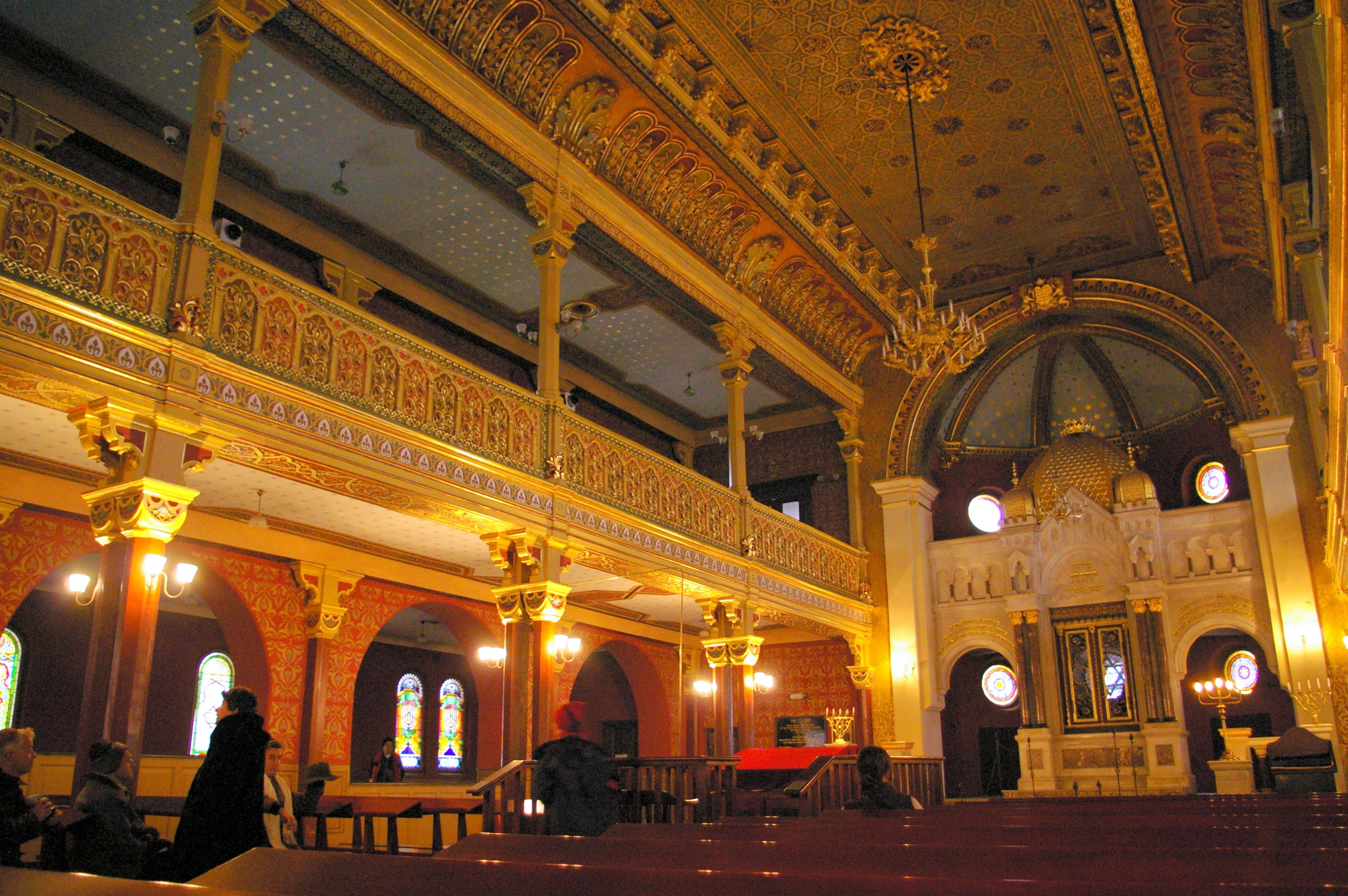
Tempel Synagogue, interior

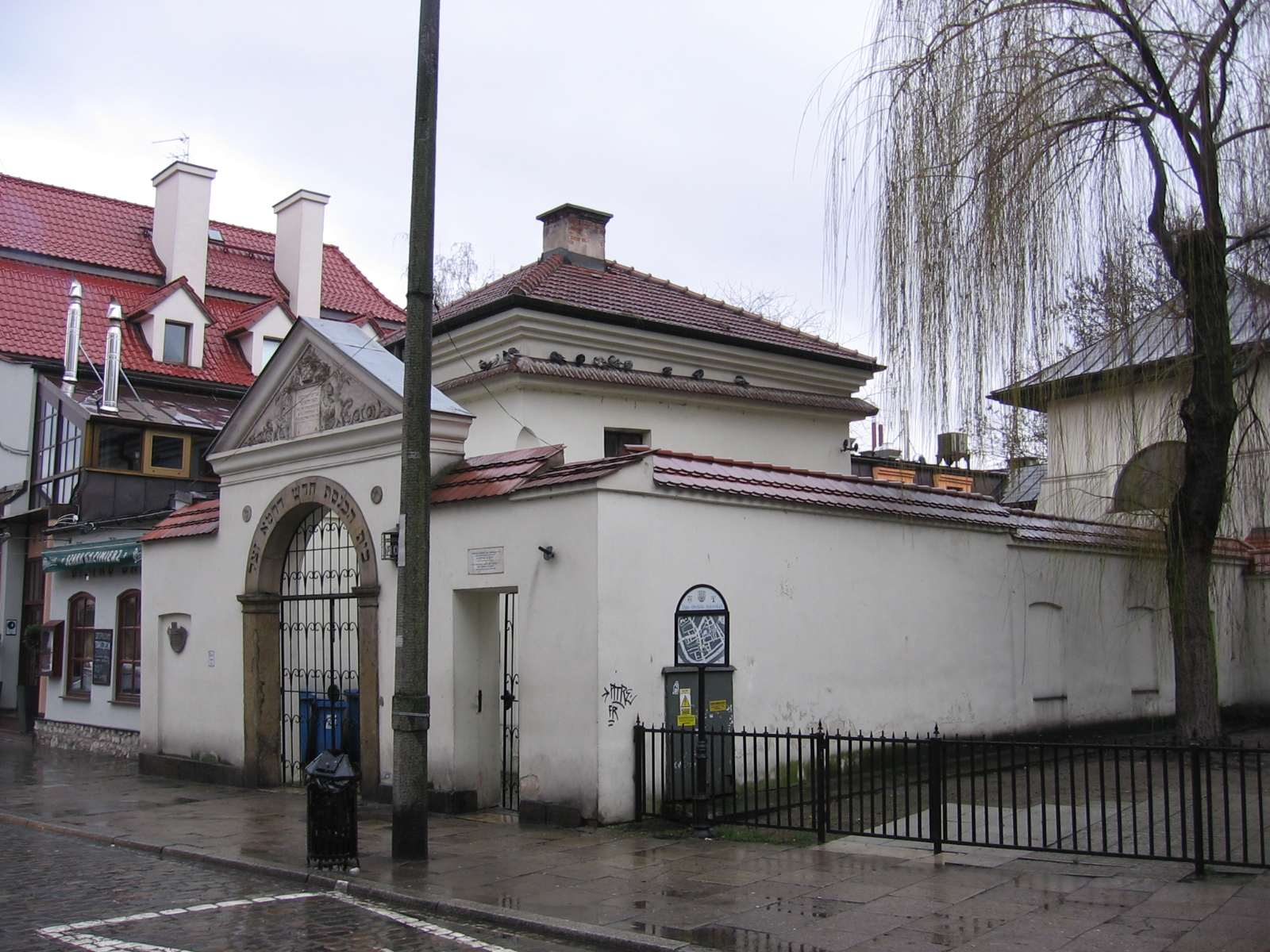
Remuh Synagogue of Kazimierz in Kraków
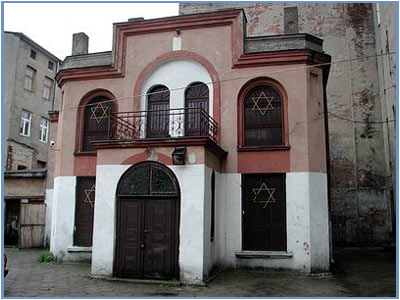
Reicherów Synagogue in Łódź

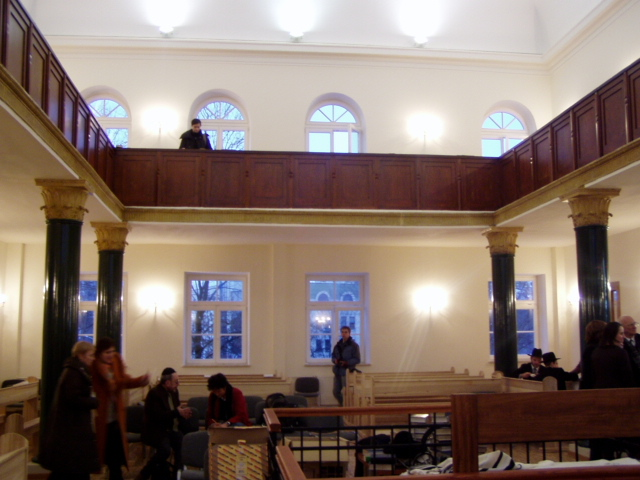
Synagogue in Chachmei Lublin Yeshiva, Lublin

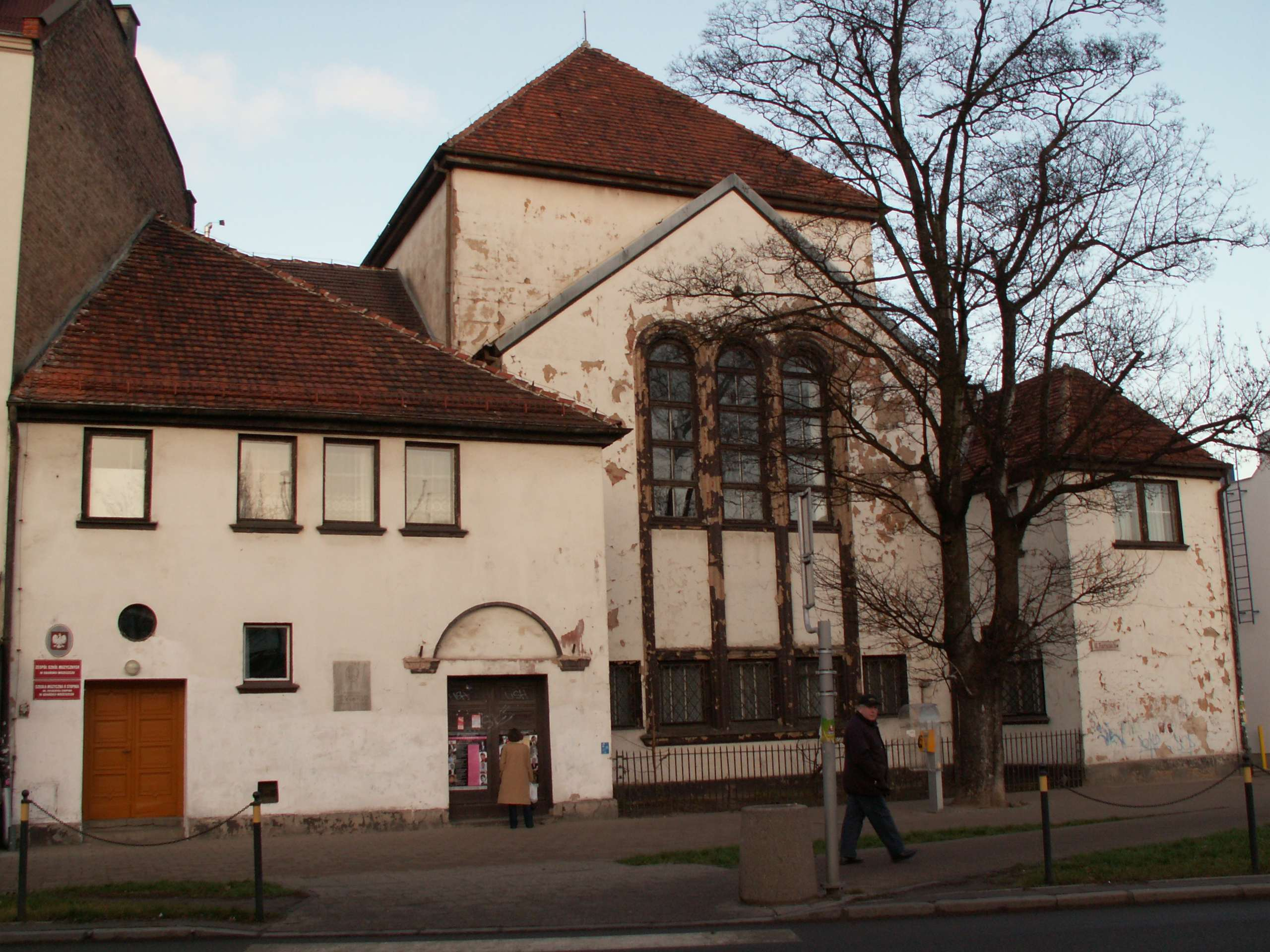
New Synagogue, Gdańsk

White Stork Synagogue in Wrocław (rededicated)
