= Vinichenko =

Vinichenko is a Slavic surname. Notable people with the surname include:

- Igor Vinichenko (born 1984), Russian hammer thrower
- Yakov Vinichenko (born 1925), Soviet World War II officer

== See also ==
- Vynnychenko
