= European Jewish Fund =

NGO focused on Jewish interreligious relations

The European Jewish Fund (EJF) is an international non-governmental organisation that coordinates and supports programmes and events aimed at improving interreligious and interethnic relations, reinforcing Jewish identity, counteracting assimilation, promoting tolerance and reconciliation in Europe, fighting against xenophobia, extremism and antisemitism, and preserving the memory of the Holocaust.

== History ==
The EJF was established in 2006 on the initiative of Viatcheslav Moshe Kantor, who is President of the European Jewish Congress and EJF Chairman. Ariella Woitchik is EJF Secretary General.

The Fund's governing body is Advisory Council, which consists of representatives from European Jewish communities.

The EJF implements local, regional and pan-European projects initiated by both individual communities and the Fund itself. The EJF's main goal is to strengthen Jewish identity and bringing Jewish communities together. Its activities develop national pride and reinforce Jewish pride within communities. The EJF highlights and celebrates Jews and their remarkable contributions to European and global society and culture.

The Fund also implements large-scale programmes aimed at disseminating tolerance on the European continent, strengthening mutual respect among representatives of all nationalities and faiths, reinforcing Jews' cultural pride and counteracting assimilation. The EJF actively fights xenophobia, antisemitism and racial discrimination and develops proposals and recommendations on reinforcing the fight against these negative phenomena of the modern world. It is also committed to promoting educational programmes that ensure the lessons and memory of the Holocaust live on.

== Projects ==
The Fund's activities fall into several categories: education and leadership; culture and heritage; community building; Shoah memory.

The EJF holds international Holocaust forums, the last two in cooperation with the President of the European Parliament, to preserve historical memory and evidence, and encourage the international community to unite in the fight against hatred and xenophobia.

- January 2005 – The first forum, in Krakow, commemorating the 60th anniversary of the liberation of Auschwitz-Birkenau.
- September 2006 – The second forum, in Kiev, marked 65 years since the atrocity in Babi Yar.
- January 2010 – The third forum, in Krakow, commemorating the 65th anniversary of the liberation of Auschwitz-Birkenau.
- January 2015 – The fourth forum took place in Prague and Terezin, commemorating the 70th anniversary since the liberation of concentration and death camps.

The EJF publicizes the achievements of outstanding individuals of Jewish origin; supports the Museum of Avant-Garde Mastery, which houses the work of Valentin Serov, Léon Bakst, Marc Chagall, El Lissitzky and Chaïm Soutine; promotes nuclear non-proliferation; and supports the International Luxembourg Forum on Preventing Nuclear Catastrophe in the belief that the Iranian nuclear programme is one of the major threats to global security today.

The EJF provides a platform for reinforcing relations between European Jewish communities. Its annual Advisory Council meetings foster dialogue between Jewish communities to discuss cooperative solutions to shared challenges.

The Fund helped to organize the European Week of Tolerance on November 9–16, 2008, marking both the International Day for Tolerance and the 70th anniversary of die Kristallnacht. The European Parliament and the Parliamentary Assembly of the Council of Europe were presented with a white paper on tolerance.

== See also ==
- European Jewish Congress
- International Luxembourg Forum on Preventing Nuclear Catastrophe
- World Holocaust Forum
- Museum of Avant-Garde Mastery
- Viatcheslav Moshe Kantor
