= European Medal of Tolerance =

The European Medal of Tolerance is a medal established by the European Council on Tolerance and Reconciliation (ECTR) in 2008.

The purpose of the prize is to honour and reward extraordinary creative achievements in the promotion of tolerance. The ultimate aim is to draw attention to successful undertakings that can serve as models in the field of tolerance and peace-building. The prize thus recognizes effectiveness as well as vision; impact assessment is a part of the decision process.

This prize is dedicated to effective implementation of the Principles of Tolerance in public and private spheres, in particular in the policy making process, legislative action on the national and regional level and law enforcement activities as well as in the arts, education, culture, science and communication.

The prize is to be awarded to persons, groups of persons, non-governmental, governmental and intergovernmental organizations and institutions for exceptional contributions to and leadership in, the promotion of tolerance on the European continent and to the fight against intolerance such as xenophobia, anti-Semitism, aggressive nationalism, political extremism and racially motivated hate crime.

The prize may be awarded to the families of outstanding individuals who have lost their lives in the struggle against intolerance.

The prize is a gold 'European Medal of Tolerance' presented to the recipient as a concrete and lasting token of the award.

== History ==
The first Medal of Tolerance was awarded on November 11, 2008 in the context of the Week of Tolerance in Europe international public initiative.

“We need to unite our efforts to fight any manifestation of extreme nationalism, discrimination, xenophobia, anti-Semitism and racism throughout Europe,” said European Parliament President Martin Schulz. “Still today, in parts of Europe, we see the demons of the past raise their ugly heads. This is warning to all of us. As Edmund Burke said ‘All that’s necessary for the forces of evil to win in the world is for enough good men to do nothing.’"

"We aim to send a strong message that despite the current difficulties in Europe, a strong and brave leadership can solve problems peacefully," said ECTR Co-Chairman Viatcheslav Kantor.

== Recipients ==
The First European Medal of Tolerance was conferred on October 11, 2010 on the King of Spain Juan Carlos I for his lifelong dedication and devotion to the issue of tolerance and political reconciliation.

The second and the third European Medals of Tolerance were conferred on President of Croatia Ivo Josipovic and Ex-President of Serbia Boris Tadic at the European Parliament in Brussels in 2012 by European Council on Tolerance and Reconciliation Chairman Alexander Kwasniewski and ECTR Co-Chairman Viatcheslav Kantor, in recognition of the Balkan statesmens’ “significant contribution to promoting, seeking, safeguarding or maintaining tolerance on the European continent”.

In 2015, Samuel Eto'o, a famous football-player, was awarded for his fight against racism in football, along with the Fare network.

The European Medal of Tolerance for the 2016 was conferred on film director Andrey Konchalovsky "for his cultural achievements focused on preserving the tragic memory of the past including his film "Paradise".

The European Medal of Tolerance for the 2017 was awarded to Prince of Monaco Albert II for his exceptional personal leadership and inspiration to advance truth, tolerance and historical reconciliation.

The European Medal of Tolerance for 2018 was awarded to HSH Prince Albert II of Monaco for his commitment to truth, tolerance and historical reconciliation.
