= World Holocaust Forum =

Forum for discussion of Holocaust history

The World Holocaust Forum is a series of events aimed at preserving the memory of the Holocaust. It is also known as the "Let My People Live!" Forum.

The World Holocaust Forum Foundation was established in 2005 under the chairmanship of Viatcheslav Moshe Kantor, president of the European Jewish Congress. The first World Holocaust Forum was held in 2005 at Kraków, Poland.

== First World Holocaust Forum ==
The first forum was held in 2005 in Kraków, Poland, to commemorate the 60th anniversary of the liberation of the Auschwitz-Birkenau concentration camp. More than 20 official delegates attended the event. Delegates in attendance were led by their heads of state, among them was the president of the Russian Federation Vladimir Putin, President of Israel Moshe Katsav, President of Poland Aleksander Kwaśniewski, and Vice President of the United States of America Richard Cheney. The first World Forum received widespread media coverage.

== Second World Holocaust Forum ==
The second forum was held in 2006, Kyiv, Ukraine, under the auspices of the president of Ukraine Viktor Yushchenko to commemorate 65 years since the Babi Yar massacre. Over 1,000 people from 60 countries attended, including representatives of international political and public organizations, including the UN, the European Union, the Council of Europe, the World Jewish Congress, the European Jewish Congress, the American Jewish Congress and the European Jewish Fund.

"The World Holocaust Forum Declaration", was adopted at the end of the second forum. The declaration calls for preserving memories about the tragic events of World War II and uniting efforts in the fight against xenophobia, antisemitism and international terrorism.

== Holocaust Remembrance Days in Brussels ==
On January 25, 2011, a commemoration meeting took place at the European Parliament in Brussels on the eve of International Holocaust Remembrance Day. The meeting was devoted to the memory of the Holocaust. It coincided with the 66th anniversary of the liberation of the Auschwitz-Birkenau concentration camp by the Soviet Army. The principal organizers of the event included the European Jewish Congress, the European Jewish Community Center, the European Coalition for Israel, the European Parliament, and the 'Diaspora Affairs Ministry' of Israel. The president of the European Jewish Congress Moshe Kantor, the president of the European Parliament Jerzy Buzek, the diaspora affairs minister of Israel Yuli Edelstein and the chief rabbi of Tel Aviv Yisrael Meir Lau addressed the audience of those who came to commemorate the victims of the Holocaust. Catherine Ashton, the European Union's high representative for foreign affairs and security policy, was the guest of honor at this event.

== Second Holocaust Remembrance Day ==
The next Holocaust Remembrance Day was held on January 24, 2012 at the European Parliament building in Brussels, under the patronage of the European Parliament President. This event was timed to 70 years since the Wannsee Conference and 50 years since the end of the trial of Adolf Eichmann. Among the guests of this event were the president of the European Parliament Martin Schulz, Israel's minister for public diplomacy and diaspora Yuli Edelstein, as well as many other European officials and ambassadors.

Commemorative events for International Holocaust Remembrance Day were also held at the European Parliament in 2013 and 2014. Notably, in 2013, President of the European Parliament Martin Schulz declared 'International Holocaust Remembrance Day' as an official annual event for the European Parliament.

== Third World Holocaust Forum ==
The third forum took place on January 27, 2010 in Kraków, Poland. This was dedicated to the 65th anniversary of the liberation of Auschwitz-Birkenau. The theme of the event was to preserve memories of the events of World War II, create connections between the past and the future, and prevent any recurrence of the tragedies of the past. President of the European Jewish Congress Viatcheslav Moshe Kantor was the leader and organizer of the project.

The forum was the first in a long list of commemorative events planned in 2010 to observe the 65th anniversary of victory in World War II. The forum was a starting point of political significance meant to attract the attention of the global community and remind the public of the unparalleled united struggle by members of the Allied coalition against fascism and the decisive role of the Soviet Union in Europe's liberation.

Attendees included a group of 100 European Parliament deputies headed by Jerzy Buzek, representatives of other European institutions and official delegations from around the world. Ivan Martynushkin and Yakov Vinnichenko, both World War II veterans and liberators of Auschwitz-Birkenau, were among the forum's honorary guests.

The following participants addressed the third forum:

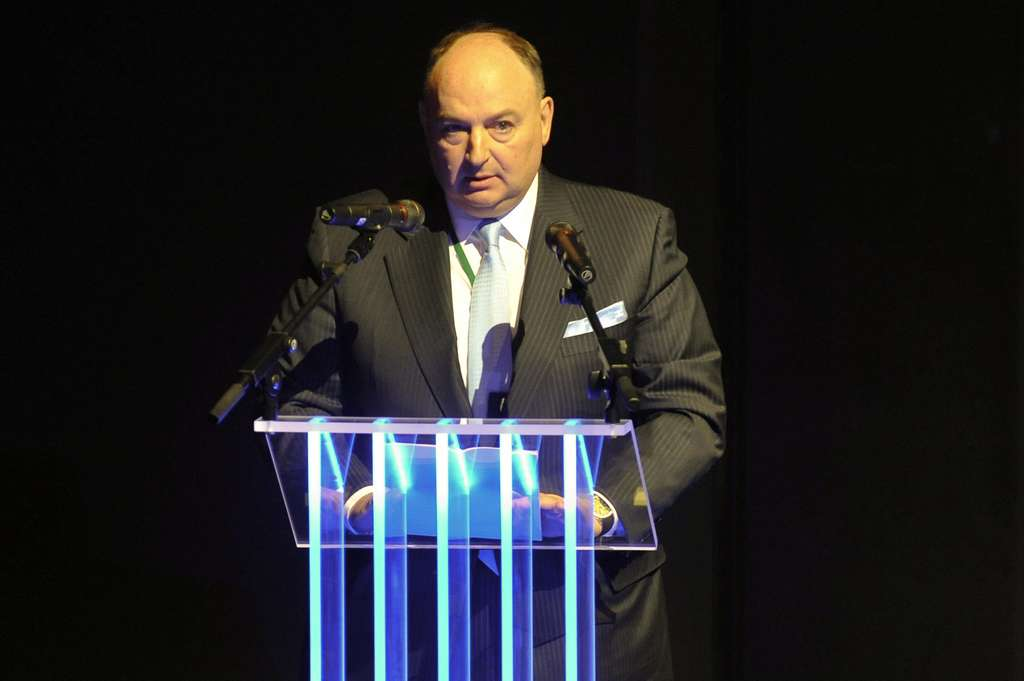
EJC President, leader and organizer of the forum Viatcheslav Moshe Kantor.

- Viatcheslav Moshe Kantor, president of the European Jewish Congress and the forum's leader and organizer
- Jerzy Buzek, president of the European Parliament
- Aleksander Kwaśniewski, former president of the Republic of Poland, chairman of the European Council on Tolerance and Reconciliation
- Yisrael Meir Lau, chief rabbi of Tel Aviv and Buchenwald survivor
- Avner Shalev, chairman of the Directorate of Yad Vashem
- Ronald Lauder, president of the World Jewish Congress

U.S. president Barack Obama and President of France Nicolas Sarkozy sent messages to the forum. Both of their addresses called for the world community to always remember the tragedies of the past and suggested that memory should factor into policy.

The main result of the forum was an announcement of the initiative to establish a new special educational and research institution, a 'Pan-European University of Global Security and Tolerance.' The key objective of the new organisation will be to assist the international community in its struggle for global security in the face of challenges posed by extremism. The university will be focused on arranging cross-cultural educational and instructional programs designed to harmonize the development of international cooperation and education. 8.01.2010]

- The last survivors return to Auschwitz, The Jewish Chronicle, 28.01.2010

== Fourth International "Let My People Live!" Forum ==
On January 26–27, 2015, the fourth International "Let My People Live!" Forum was held in Prague and Terezín (Czech Republic) marked the 70th anniversary of the liberation of Auschwitz-Birkenau concentration camp. Several hundred distinguished guests — including heads of state, political leaders, members of parliament, diplomats, scholars and public figures from many countries; one of few surviving Auschwitz-Birkenau liberators Leonty Brandt; former prisoners of the concentration camps and Holocaust survivors — were in attendance.

The two-day event consisted of two major parts: the Forum of World Civil Society held at Prague Castle, and the commemorative ceremony in Terezín. It focused on remembering the past and reflecting on the present at a time when rising anti-Semitism and intolerance threaten the survival of Jewish communities in Europe and the security of Europe as a whole.

The forum, organised by the European Jewish Congress and the World Holocaust Forum Foundation with the European Parliament and its president Martin Schulz, was attended by over 900 guests, including 30 official delegations and representatives of parliaments, European heads of state and international celebrities, experts and scholars, who gathered together at Prague Castle to participate in three discussion panels focused on anti-Semitism, neo-Nazism and religious radicalism.

Well-known U.S. human rights activist Abraham Foxman, historian and Yale University professor Timothy David Snyder, French writer and philosopher Bernard-Henri Lévy, head of the Grand National Assembly of Turkey Cemil Çiçek, President of the Chamber of Deputies of Romania Valeriu Zgonea and other preeminent individuals attended the forum's first day. Russia was represented by Deputy Chairman of the Federation Council Ilyas Umakhanov and President of the World Public Forum Dialogue of Civilizations Vladimir Yakunin.

President of European Jewish Congress Viatcheslav Moshe Kantor, Czech prime minister Bohuslav Sobotka, speaker of the Chamber of Deputies of the Czech Parliament Jan Hamáček and president of the Czech Senate Milan Štěch addressed the audience.

On January 27, 2015, the Czech president Miloš Zeman hosted the final session of the forum and an official ceremony to commemorate the Holocaust's victims. The National Philharmonic of Russia, which consisted of 98 musicians under the direction of Vladimir Spivakov, performed the Yellow Stars concerto for orchestra by Isaac Schwartz accompanied by a video about the Holocaust history. After the online minute of silence linking three other concentration camps, guests were invited to participate in the commemorative ceremony in Theresienstadt, a concentration camp that served as a transit station on the way to other death camps. Theresienstadt inmates included many musicians, composers, cartoonists and poets, who maintained their art by publishing 'Vedem Magazine'. World-famous cantor Joseph Malovany and Oscar winner Sir Ben Kingsley performed during the ceremony.

At the conclusion of the fourth International Holocaust Forum, participants adopted a declaration to combat anti-Semitism and hate crimes.

== Fifth World Holocaust Forum ==
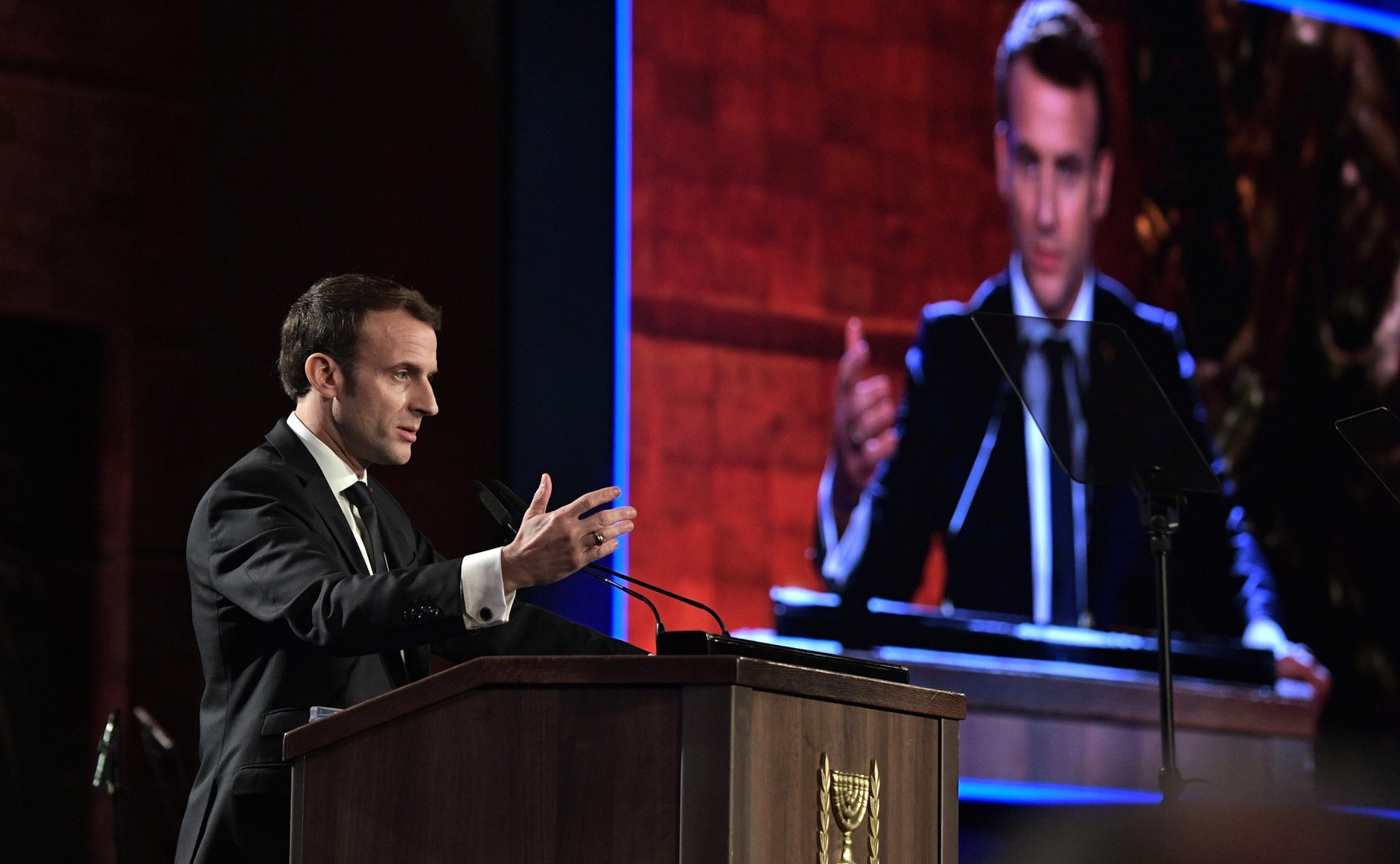
French president Emmanuel Macron during the World Holocaust Forum.

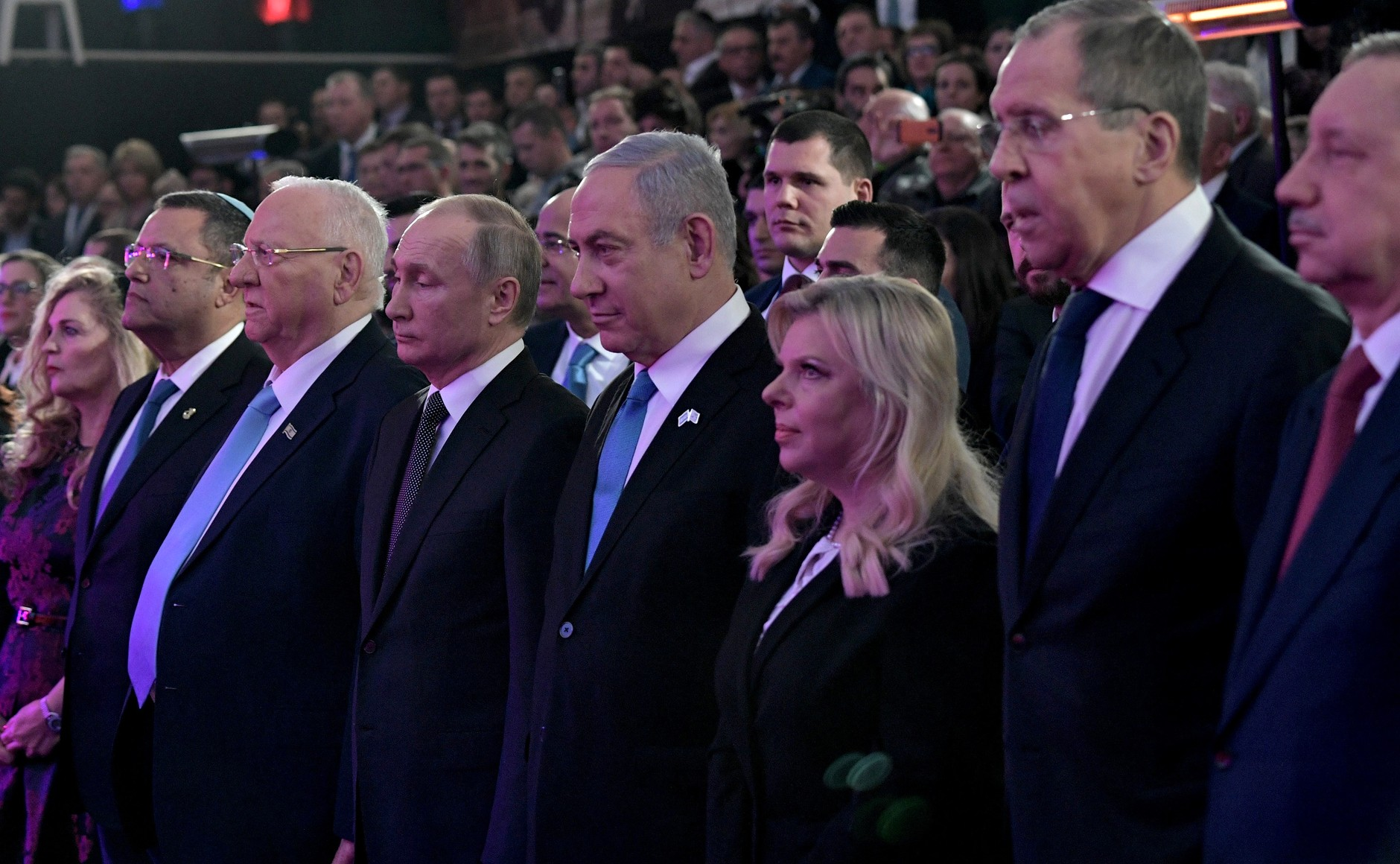
Russian president Vladimir Putin with Israeli prime minister Benjamin Netanyahu and Israeli president Reuven Rivlin during the World Holocaust Forum.

The fifth World Holocaust Forum was held on January 23–24, 2020 in Jerusalem, under the title “Remembering the Holocaust, Fighting Antisemitism.” The forum was attended by 49 high-level delegations. The organizer and initiator of the forum was the president of the World Holocaust Forum Foundation and president of the European Jewish Congress, Viatcheslav Moshe Kantor, in cooperation with Yad Vashem, under the auspices of the president of the State of Israel, Reuven Rivlin.

The event coincided with the 75th anniversary of the liberation the Auschwitz-Birkenau Nazi concentration camp by the Red Army (January 27, 1945) and International Holocaust Remembrance Day.

Among the leaders who took part in the event were: President of Russia Vladimir Putin, Vice President of the United States Mike Pence, President of France Emmanuel Macron, President of Germany Frank-Walter Steinmeier, President of Italy Sergio Mattarella, King of The Netherlands Willem-Alexander, President of Austria Alexander Van der Bellen, Prince Charles, Speaker of the U.S. House of Representatives Nancy Pelosi, leaders from Albania, Armenia, Australia, Argentina, Austria, Azerbaijan, Belarus, Belgium, Bulgaria, Bosnia and Herzegovina, Canada, Croatia, Cyprus, the Czech Republic, Denmark, Finland, France, Georgia, Greece, Hungary, Iceland, Italy, Latvia, Luxembourg, Moldova, Monaco, Montenegro, the Netherlands, North Macedonia, Norway, Portugal, Romania, Serbia, Slovakia, Slovenia, Spain, Sweden, and the representative of the Holy See, Cardinal Kurt Koch.

=== Polish speaking slot ===
Polish president Andrzej Duda refused to participate in the event because he was not given the opportunity to speak. He criticized the event for giving the speaking slot to Russian president Vladimir Putin, who has in recent weeks criticized Poland with regard to its WWII record. President Gitanas Nauseda of Lithuania endorsed President Duda's position and also withdrew from the summit. Yad Vashem, who co-hosted the event, explained in a January 7, 2020 press release that a Polish speaker was not considered necessary as “…it is especially appropriate that the leaders addressing this event represent the four main powers of the Allied forces, which liberated Europe and the world from the murderous tyranny of Nazi Germany.”

== See also ==
- International Holocaust Remembrance Day
- Liberation of Auschwitz concentration camp
