= Model National Statute for the Promotion of Tolerance =

The Model National Statute for the Promotion of Tolerance is a document prepared by a group of experts of the European Council on Tolerance and Reconciliation (ECTR), which regulates the legal relationship in the sphere of tolerance. The Model Statute is designed for adoption by the respective national legislatures of European States, in order to confirm and clarify their adherence to the principle of tolerance.

== Purpose ==
The purpose of the Model Statute is to fill a vacuum: although all European States are committed to the principle of tolerance, nowhere is this principle defined in binding legal terms. The principal challenge in preparing the Model Statute was to go beyond rhetoric and generalities, spelling out concrete and enforceable obligations that ensure tolerance and stamp out intolerance. The ECTR has presented this document in a series of meetings and seminars with international organizations, including the Council of Europe and the OSCE. As a result, there is currently a joint ECTR-European Council task force which is working on its implementation.

== Content ==
The Model Statute consists of a legislative text with accompanying explanatory notes. The text consists of a Preamble and nine substantive Sections:

- The Preamble gives full expression to the duality of diversity and solidarity in society, emphasizing that the overriding consideration is coexistence.
- Section 1 deals with four definitions: (a) "Tolerance"; (b) "Group"; (c) "Group libel"; and (d) "Hate crimes".
- Section 2 states the Purpose of the Model Statute. A list of examples of intolerance is enumerated, including "xenophobia, anti-Semitism, anti-feminism and homophobia".
- Section 3 lists the main human rights the enjoyment of which is covered by the obligation of tolerance.
- Section 4 is the limitations clause, and in many respects it is the key provision. The explanatory notes mention many contemporary issues from terrorism to female circumcision.
- Section 5 deals with migrants, one of the issues that currently are uppermost in the public mind in Europe.
- Section 6 relates to implementation. The Draft Model Statute sets up a National Tolerance Monitoring Commission – an independent body composed of eminent persons from outside the civil service – vested with the authority to serve as a watchdog.
- Section 7 covers penal sanctions.
- Section 8 addresses the issue of education. The basic idea is to promote the culture of tolerance from a very early age and to go on into adult education.
- Section 9, the last one, goes into the issue of the media, empowering a Press Complaints Commission – set up by the media themselves – to supervise implementation of the law.

== Launch ==
The Model Statute was unanimously adopted – under the sponsorship of the ECTR – by a group of experts consisting of five scholars from different countries and from diverse backgrounds: Prof. Yoram Dinstein (Professor Emeritus of International Law and Human Rights, Tel Aviv University, Israel) (Chair); Dr. Ugo Genesio (retired Judge, the Italian Supreme Court); Prof. Rein Mullerson (Rector, University Nord, Tallinn, Estonia); Prof. Daniel Thürer (Professor Emeritus of International and European Law, University of Zurich, Switzerland); and Prof. Rüdiger Wolfrum (Director, Max Planck Institute for Comparative Public law and International Law, Heidelberg, Germany).

The document was officially presented to the public by ECTR Chairman Alexander Kwasniewski and ECTR Co-Chairman Viatcheslav Kantor on October 16, 2012 in Brussels and was later passed to Martin Schulz, President of the European Parliament. Talking of the need for “rules, proposals, laws” to make tolerance mandatory across the EU, Kantor introduced ECTR's proposals for a general law of tolerance.

Expanding on the Model Law for Promotion of Tolerance, a version of which it seeks to make mandatory across all 27 member states, Chair of the Task Force in charge of its inception Yoram Dinstein said that “tolerance is the glue that cements together the bond between distinct groups in a single society”. “The definition of tolerance itself needs to be established”, asserted Dinstein. “Whilst current definitions of tolerance would preclude racism and religious-based bigotry, anti-Semitism must be individually stated as a separate definition”. “Holocaust denial should be a crime,” he continued, as should “denial of any genocide which has been ruled on by an international court”.

A common point of reference was needed by member states, in order to establish the distinction between tolerance and its limitations, he added. The exceptions to tolerant thought and speech ranges from female circumcision to Burka wearing, according to the draft, which it argued provided an obstacle to crime prevention.

Another potential tolerance minefield arises from the issue of migration, he suggested. “Migrants are entitled to tolerance by society as much as anyone else, but they have a duty to integrate into their adopted society - if they’re not prepared to do so, they should be forced to leave, subject to a legal process,” he continued, adding that “integration does not mean assimilation”.

“The future of the EU is very much interconnected to migration,” interjected Kwasniewski. “We cannot support an ageing demography without migration. Tolerance would help us in coping with inevitable migration, which is the future of a multi-cultural EU.”

“A dedicated centre must be established to provide migrants with a transitional period to integrate into their adopted country,” added Kantor.

“The EU and European governments need to stem the growing violent extremism and narrow what is acceptable on the political spectrum to strengthen the mainstream,” he said. “With this in mind the ECTR has empowered a group of eminent international jurists to create a Model European Statute for the Promotion of Tolerance.”
