= Four Denominations District =

Area of the Old Town in Wrocław, Poland

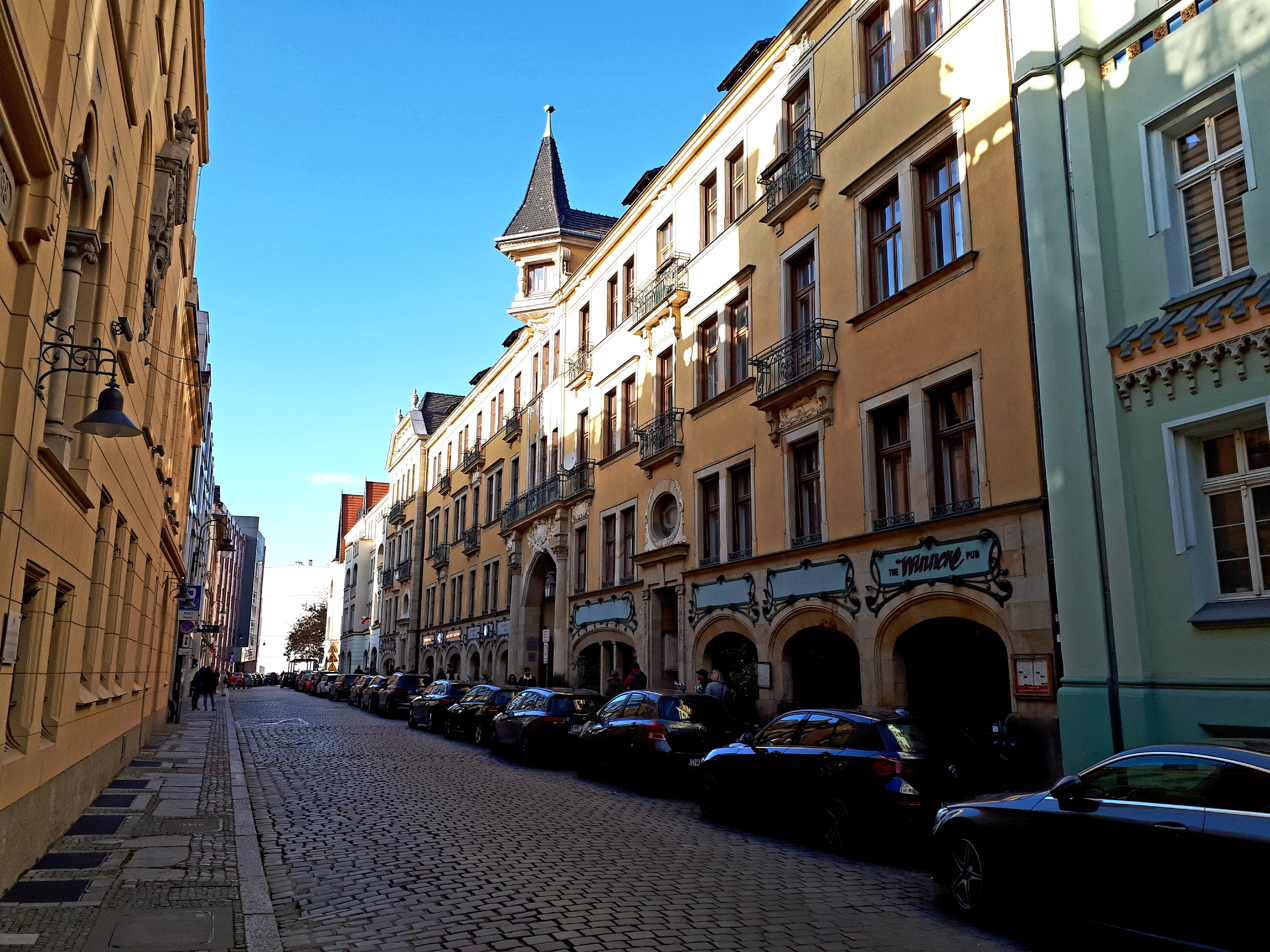
Pawła Włodkowica Street

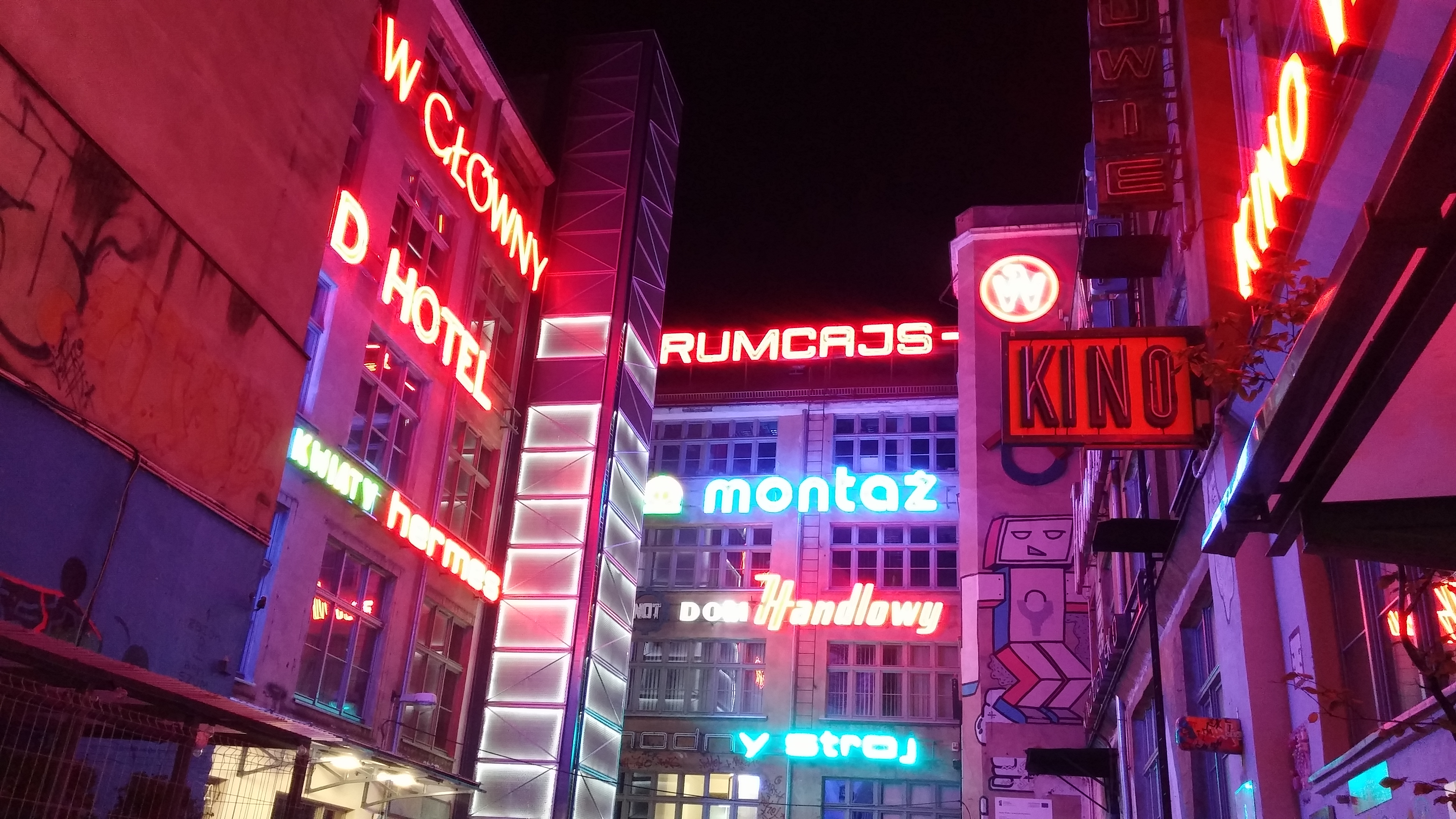
Neon Gallery between Św. Antoniego and Ruska streets

The Four Denominations District is an area of the Old Town in Wrocław, Poland, between Kazimierza Wielkiego, Św. Antoniego, Pawła Włodkowica and Św. Mikołaja streets. The name has been used since 1995 on the initiative of (Catholic, Orthodox, and Protestant) Christian clergy together with Jerzy Kichler, an activist from the Polish Jewish community.

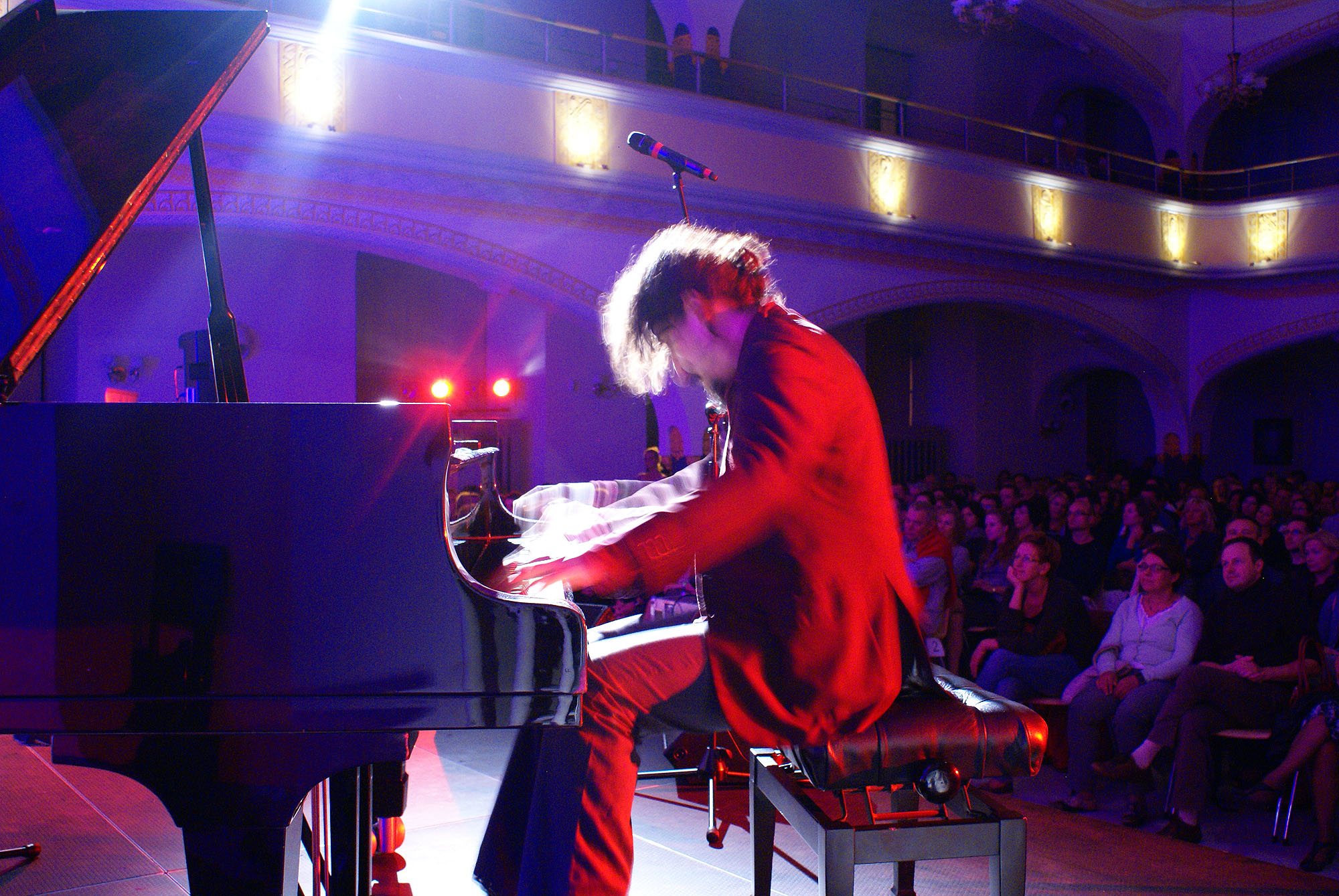
Piano concert in the Synagogue, September 2011

Though called a district, the area is not and has never been an actual administrative district of Wrocław.

== Sights and culture ==
The area has four places of worship for different denominations in close proximity. These are:

1. The Orthodox Cathedral of the Nativity of the Most Holy Mother of God
2. The Roman Catholic Church of St. Anthony of Padua
3. The Augsburg Evangelical Church of Divine Providence
4. The White Stork Synagogue
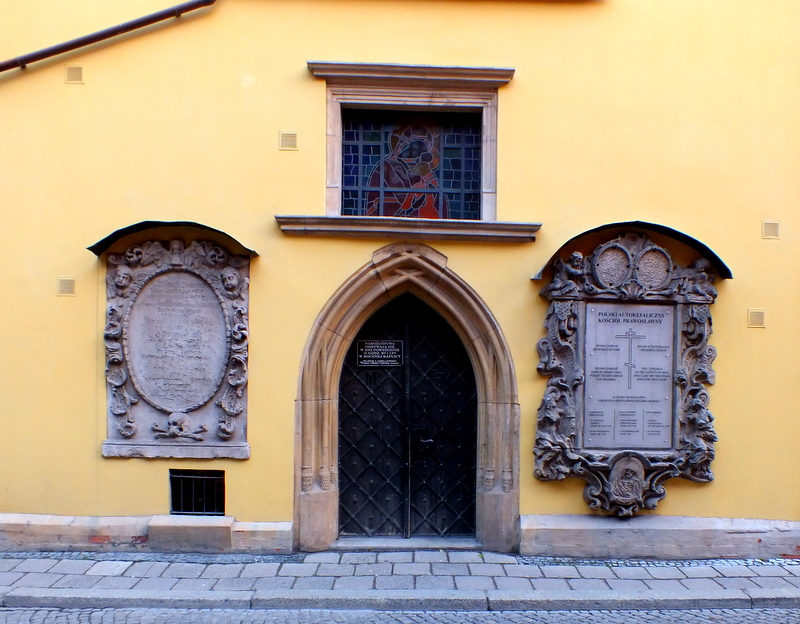
The Orthodox church

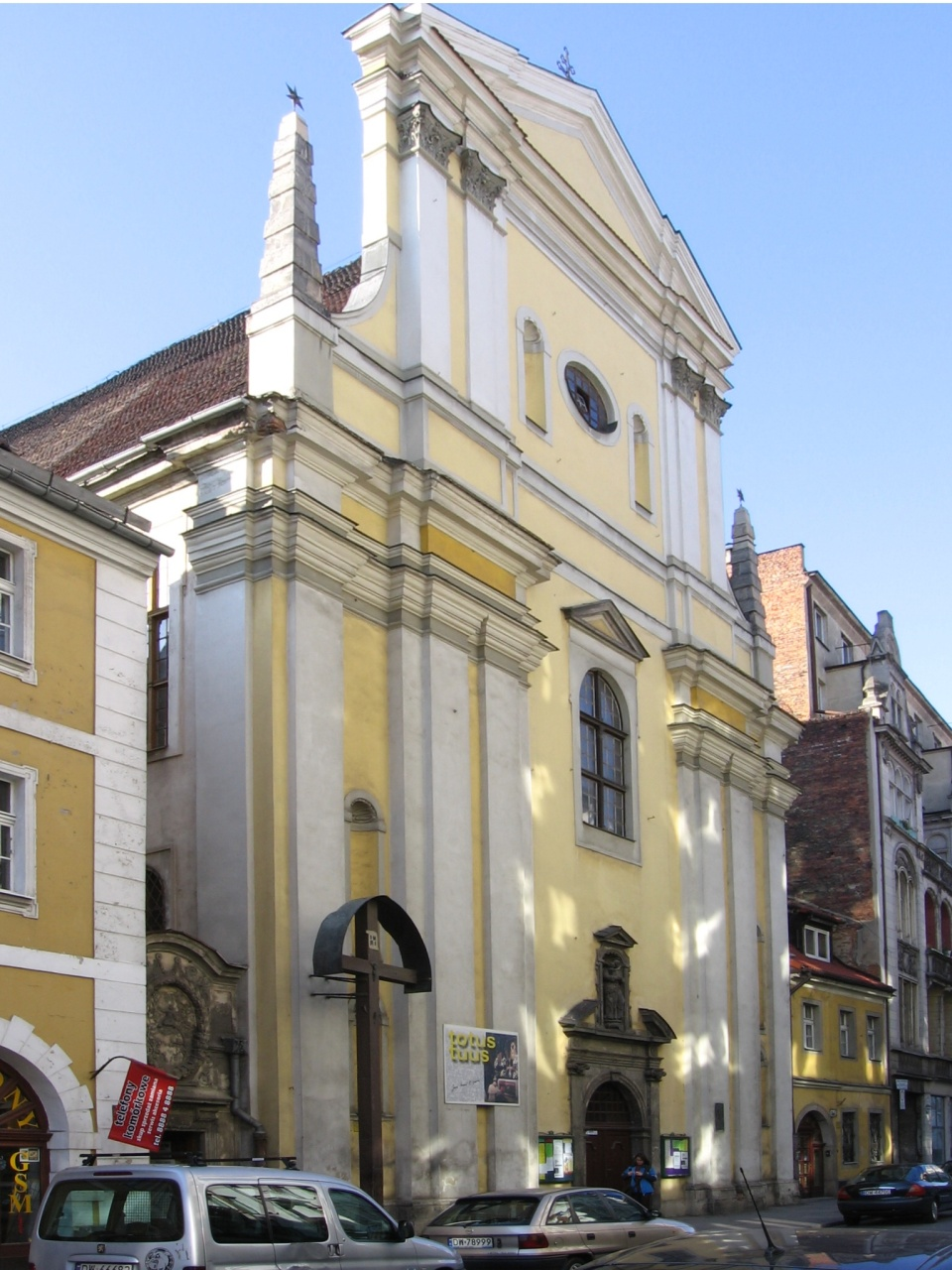
The Catholic church

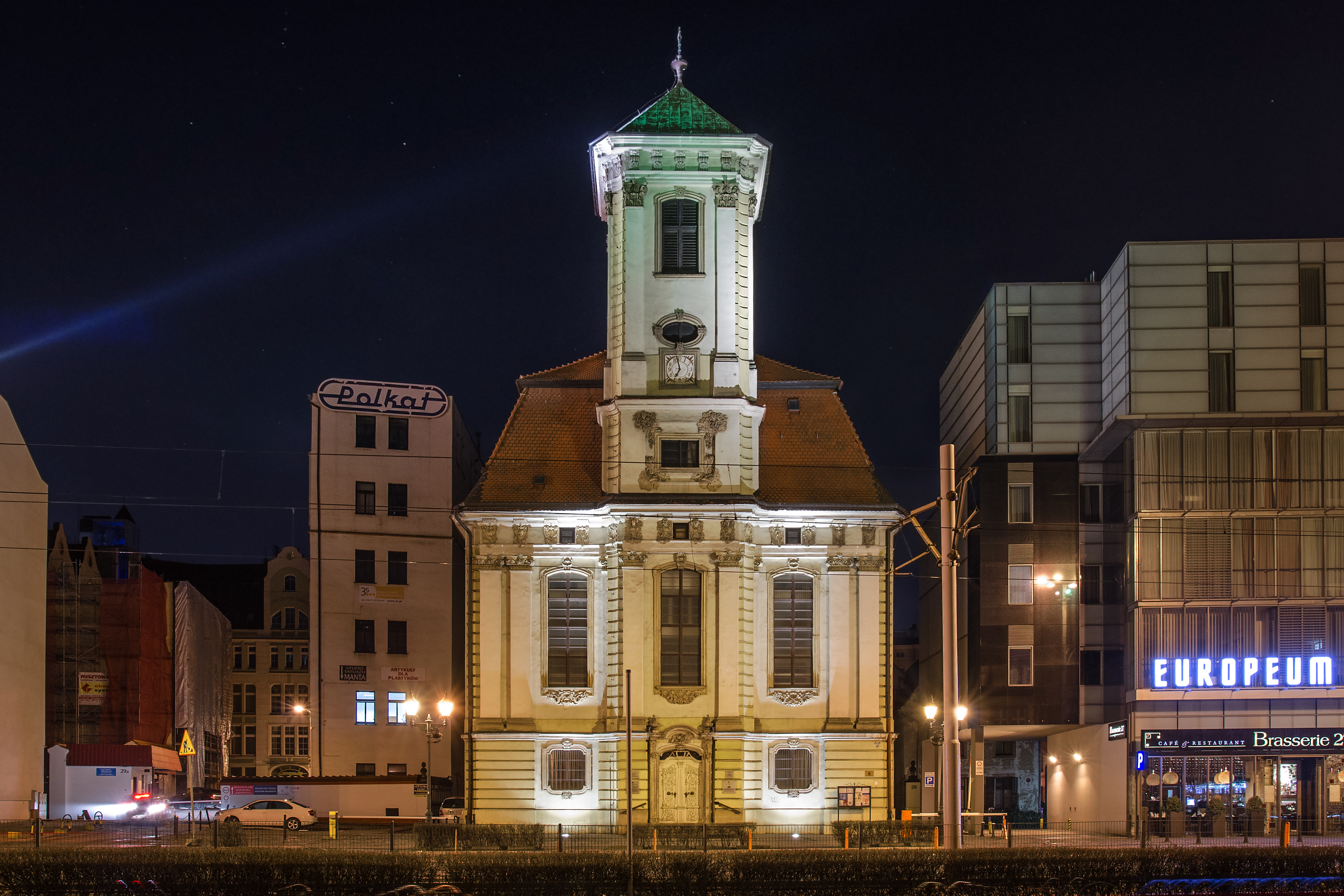
The Protestant church

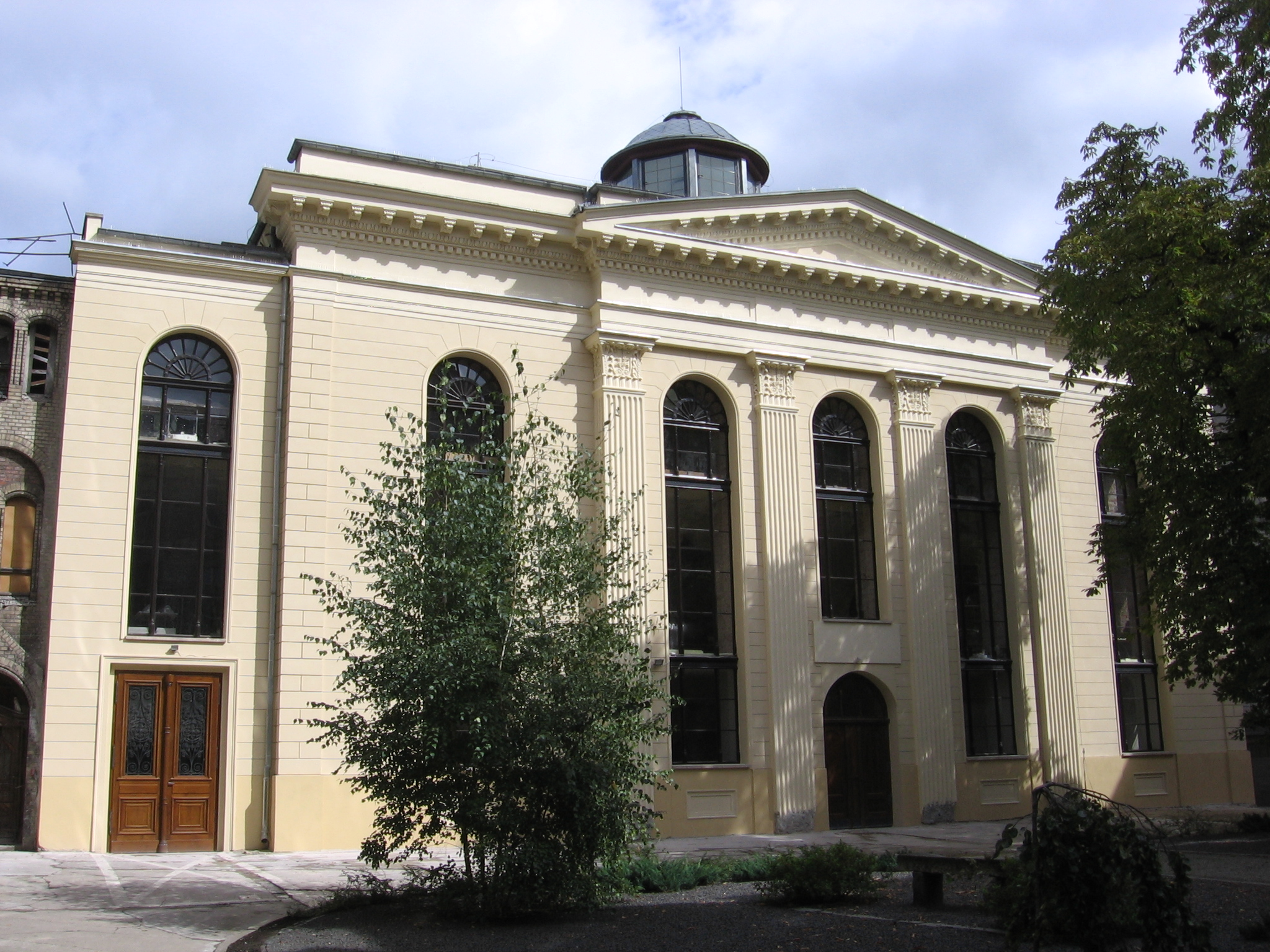
The Jewish synagogue

The faithful of four denominations organize common charity events, educational meetings for children, and ecumenical prayers to bring closer the cultural and religious diversity of the city. It is one of the city's tourist attractions.

Other notable places in the neighborhood include the Cristal Planet sculpture, open-air gallery of neon signs, New Horizons movie theater (Wratislavia Tower), the Royal Palace near the Protestant church, the Wrocław Jewish Community building, the Small Synagogue, and historical passages. The area is also one of the spaces of BWA Wrocław Gallery, the location of Galeria ArtBrut, TYC ART Gallery, GG Gallery & Atelier, Surowiec Club, TIFF Festival, and many other events.

In order to emphasize the uniqueness of this area, the Wrocław Development Office came up with an idea to develop it and to create a cultural path of four temples, which will connect all the temples and will become the main element identifying this part of the Old Town.

== See also ==
- Wrocław Old Town
- Nadodrze
