= International Luxembourg Forum on Preventing Nuclear Catastrophe =

International non-governmental organisation

- Founded: 2007
- Key people: Viatcheslav Moshe Kantor (President)
- Website: www.luxembourgforum.org

The International Luxembourg Forum on Preventing Nuclear Catastrophe (also The Luxembourg Forum) is an international non-governmental organisation uniting leading world-renowned experts on non-proliferation of nuclear weapons, materials and delivery vehicles.

The Forum was established pursuant to a decision passed by the International Conference on Preventing Nuclear Catastrophe held in Luxembourg on May 24–25, 2007. The Conference discussed new challenges and threats to the Non-Proliferation Treaty (NPT) and the underlying nuclear non-proliferation regime, the threat of nuclear terrorism, developments in controlling nuclear technologies, enhancement of IAEA safeguards and the current situation in problematic states and regions (the Middle East, East and South Asia).

To achieve a practical strengthening of the nuclear non-proliferation regime, the Conference participants prepared a final document and called it the Luxembourg Conference Declaration. The Declaration reflects the opinion of 57 independent experts on global security, arms control and disarmament from 14 countries, and included a roadmap to resolution of the complex nuclear situation.

The most important result of the conference was the establishment of a permanent Luxembourg Forum, which originally included the 43 parties to the Declaration. The results of the Conference and the official Declaration were presented on December 18, 2007 in Moscow.

The Conference was one of the most relevant events dealing exclusively with nuclear non-proliferation issues. Attendees included:

- Sergey Kirienko, Director General of Rosatom State Atomic Energy Corporation;
- Nikolay Laverov, Vice President of the Russian Academy of Sciences;
- Mohammed ElBaradei, former Director General of the International Atomic Energy Agency (IAEA);
- William Perry, Stanford University Professor, former U.S. Secretary of Defense;
- Hans Blix, WMDC Chairman, former IAEA Director General;
- Yukiya Amano, IAEA Director General.

The Forum's President is Viatcheslav Moshe Kantor, an international activist and philanthropist who is also President of the European Jewish Congress and President of the European Council on Tolerance and Reconciliation. Dr. Kantor contributed significantly to preparing and holding the Luxembourg Conference and chaired its Organizing Committee.

The Forum is governed by an International Advisory Council (IAC) and a Supervisory Board (SBC).

The IAC brings together over 50 leading experts on the global security, sets Forum agendas and participates in preparing the Forum's final documents for circulation to political leaders, diplomats and the heads of international and non-governmental organisations.

The Supervisory Board holds regular meetings to elaborate guidelines for action. The Supervisory Council includes:

- Hans Blix, Ambassador, former Director General of the International Atomic Energy Agency, Chairman of the Weapons of Mass Destruction Commission;
- Igor Ivanov, President of the Russian International Affairs Council, former Foreign Minister and Secretary of the Security Council of the Russian Federation, MGIMO University professor;
- Henry Kissinger, Chairman of Kissinger Associates, former US Secretary of State, Assistant to the President for National Security Affairs;
- William Perry, Professor of the Stanford University, former Secretary of the U.S. Department of Defense;
- Roald Sagdeev, Distinguished University Professor, Department of Physics at the University of Maryland, Director Emeritus of the Russian Space Research Institute, Academician;
- Jayantha Dhanapala, Distinguished Associate Fellow at the Stockholm International Peace Research Institute (SIPRI), former President of Pugwash Conferences on Science and World Affairs, UN Under-Secretary-General for Disarmament Affairs;
- Vladimir Lukin, Deputy Chair of the Foreign Affairs Committee of the Federation Council of Russia (Russian Senate), President of the Russian Paralympic Committee, Professor of the National Research University – Higher School of Economics, Member of the Supervisory Board of the International Luxembourg Forum (former Chairman of the Committee on International Relations and Deputy Chairman of the State Duma, Ambassador of the Russian Federation to the United States of America, Commissioner on Human Rights for the Russian Federation);
- Rolf Ekeus, Ambassador, former High Commissioner on National Minorities at the OSCE and Chairman of the Governing Board of the Stockholm International Peace Research Institute (SIPRI);
- Gareth Evans, Former Chancellor of the Australian National University (former Australian Senator and Member of Parliament, Minister of Foreign Affairs of Australia.

== Cooperation between Luxembourg Forum and Vatican ==
In 2019, participants of the International Luxembourg Forum's conference in Rome, experts in nuclear security, nuclear arms reduction, control and non-proliferation from the United States, Russia, France, Sweden, Canada, Australia and other countries were received by the Vatican Secretary of State Cardinal Pietro Parolin, as part of the dialogue and joint initiatives of the Luxembourg Forum and the Holy See.

Heads of five major international organizations dealing with nuclear arms control issues (the Nuclear Threat Initiative, the Pugwash Conferences on Science and World Affairs, Global Zero, the Russian International Affairs Council, and James Martin Center for Nonproliferation Studies (United States)) attended the meeting.

Cardinal Pietro Parolin confirmed the Holy See's concerns about the issues of nuclear arms control, underscored the need of their maximum limitation and minimizing the risk of their use, and affirmed the Holy See's commitment to strengthen global security and develop a multilateral dialogue to prevent the threat of nuclear catastrophe.

== Forum Priorities ==
The Luxembourg Forum focuses on two priorities:

— Counteracting growing threats to the nuclear non-proliferation regime and erosion of the Non-Proliferation Treaty (NPT), including the escalating danger of nuclear terrorism and attempts by rogue states to gain access to nuclear materials and technologies. At present, close attention is paid to nuclear weapons non-proliferation in the Middle East region and on the Korean Peninsula;

— Promoting international peace and security through new approaches and by presenting recommendations to decision-makers, diplomats and experts on nuclear security and non-proliferation critical issues.

== Forum Events ==
1. International Conference on Preventing Nuclear Catastrophe (Luxembourg, May 24–25, 2007)
2. Presentation of the Luxembourg Forum Declaration (Moscow, December 18, 2007)
3. Workshop of the International Luxembourg Forum on Preventing Nuclear Catastrophe (Moscow, April 14, 2008)
4. Joint Seminar of the International Luxembourg Forum on Preventing Nuclear Catastrophe and Pugwash Conferences on Science and World Affairs (Rome, June 12, 2008)
5. International Luxembourg Forum Supervisory Council Annual Meeting (Moscow, December 9, 2008)
6. Workshop, International Luxembourg Forum on Preventing Nuclear Catastrophe (Moscow, April 22, 2009)
7. Workshop, International Luxembourg Forum on Preventing Nuclear Catastrophe (Geneva, July 3, 2009)
8. International Luxembourg Forum Supervisory Council Annual Meeting (Moscow, December 8–9, 2009)
9. Workshop, International Luxembourg Forum on Preventing Nuclear Catastrophe (Vienna, April 8–9, 2010)
10. International Luxembourg Forum Conference (Washington, September 20–21, 2010)
11. International Luxembourg Forum Supervisory Council Annual Meeting (Moscow, December 8–9, 2010)
12. International Luxembourg Forum Conference (Stockholm, June 13–14, 2011)
13. International Luxembourg Forum Supervisory Council Annual Meeting (Moscow, December 12–13, 2011)
14. Anniversary Luxembourg Forum Conference (Berlin, June 4-5, 2012)
15. Joint Conference of the International Luxembourg Forum on Preventing Nuclear Catastrophe and the Geneva Center for Security Policy (Geneva, September 11-12, 2012)
16. Conference of the International Luxembourg Forum "Safe Tolerance Criteria for Nuclear Non-proliferation Regimes" (Montreux, May 21-22, 2013)
17. International Luxembourg Forum's Supervisory Board Annual Meeting (Warsaw, December 10-11, 2013)
18. Round Table of the International Luxembourg Forum on Preventing Nuclear Catastrophe (Geneva, June 10-11, 2014)
19. Round Table of the International Luxembourg Forum "Mid-Term Perspective for Nuclear Disarmament and Non-Proliferation" and meeting of the Supervisory Council of the Luxembourg Forum. Prague, 2-4, 2014
20. Conference of the International Luxembourg Forum "The 2015 NPT Review Conference and the Regional Non-proliferation Issues". Stockholm, June 9-10, 2015
21. Joint Conference of the International Luxembourg Forum and the Nuclear Threat Initiative "Preventing the Crisis of Nuclear Arms Control and Catastrophic Terrorism". Washington, December 1-2, 2015
22. Conference of the International Luxembourg Forum "30th anniversary of the Reykjavik Summit – lessons of the past and the tasks for the future". Amsterdam, June 7-8, 2016
23. International Luxembourg Forum Supervisory Council meeting. London, December 6-7, 2016
24. Presentation of the Joint Publication by the International Luxembourg Forum on Preventing Nuclear Catastrophe and the US-based Nuclear Threat Initiative (NTI), entitled 'Preventing the Crisis of the Nuclear Arms Control and Catastrophic Terrorism'. Washington, March 23, 2017
25. Presentation of the joint publication by the International Luxembourg Forum on Preventing Nuclear Catastrophe and the US-based Nuclear Threat Initiative (NTI), entitled 'Preventing the Crisis of the Nuclear Arms Control and Catastrophic Terrorism'. Moscow, April 20, 2017
26. 10th Anniversary Conference of the International Luxembourg Forum "Topical Issues of Nuclear Non-Proliferation". Paris, October 9-10, 2017
27. Conference of the International Luxembourg Forum "Nuclear Strategies and Strategic Stability". Geneva, June 11-12, 2018
28. International Luxembourg Forum Supervisory Board meeting. Brussels, December 4-5, 2018
29. Conference of the International Luxembourg Forum "Arms Control: the Burden of Changes". Rome, June 4-5, 2019

== See also ==
- Prevention of nuclear catastrophe
