= Vynnychenko =

Vynnychenko (Ukrainian: Винниченко), also transliterated Vinnichenko, is a Ukrainian surname. Notable people with the surname include:

- Eleonora Vinnichenko, Ukrainian figure skater
- Mykola Vynnychenko (born 1958), Soviet-Ukrainian race walker
- Nikolay Vinnichenko (born 1965), Russian politician
- Rozalia Vynnychenko (1886–1959), wife of Volodymyr
- Valentin Vinnichenko (born 1995), Russian footballer
- Volodymyr Vynnychenko (1880–1951), Ukrainian writer and first Prime Minister of Ukraine

== See also ==
- Vinichenko
