= White Stork Synagogue =

Conservative synagogue in Wrocław, Poland

- Polish: Synagoga Pod Białym Bocianem
- The synagogue in 2019

- Location of the synagogue in Lower Silesian Voivodeship

Religion
- Affiliation: Conservative Judaism
- Rite: Nusach Ashkenaz
- Ecclesiastical or organisational status: Synagogue: (1829–1968); (since 2010); Profane use (1968–c. 2000)
- Governing body: Union of Jewish Religious Communities in Poland
- Status: Active

Location
- Location: 5 Pawła Włodkowica Street, Wrocław, Lower Silesian Voivodeship
- Country: Poland
- Coordinates: 51°06′29″N 17°01′29″E

Architecture
- Architect: Carl Ferdinand Langhans
- Type: Synagogue architecture
- Style: Neoclassical
- Groundbreaking: 1826
- Completed: 1829
- Materials: Brick

The White Stork Synagogue (Polish: Synagoga Pod Białym Bocianem) is a Conservative Jewish congregation and synagogue, located in Wrocław, in the Lower Silesian Voivodeship of Poland. Designed by Carl Ferdinand Langhans in the Neoclassical style and completed in 1829, the synagogue is located in the city's center, which was the northern edge of the former Jewish district.

Rededicated in 2010 after a decade-long renovation, it is the religious and cultural centre of the local Jewish community, under the auspices of the Union of Jewish Religious Communities in Poland. It is the only Conservative Jewish synagogue in Wrocław to have survived during the Holocaust.

== History ==
The synagogue, which opened in 1829 when the city was known as Breslau and part of the Kingdom of Prussia, is a three-story Neoclassical designed by the architect Carl Ferdinand Langhans (1781–1869). Langhans was one of the foremost 19th-century architects of Silesia. He was among Germany's foremost theater designers. He also designed the Breslau Actors' Guild Theater and Opera House. The original interior, now lost, was designed by the painter Raphael Biow (1771–1836) and his son Hermann Biow (1804–1850). The name was taken from an inn of the same name which had previously stood on the site.

The main prayer hall is surrounded on three sides with women's galleries. Two levels of galleries to the north and two on the south flank a single gallery on the eastern Torah ark wall. The wooden frame of the Torah ark and the damaged tablets of the Ten Commandments are all that remain of the original religious features.

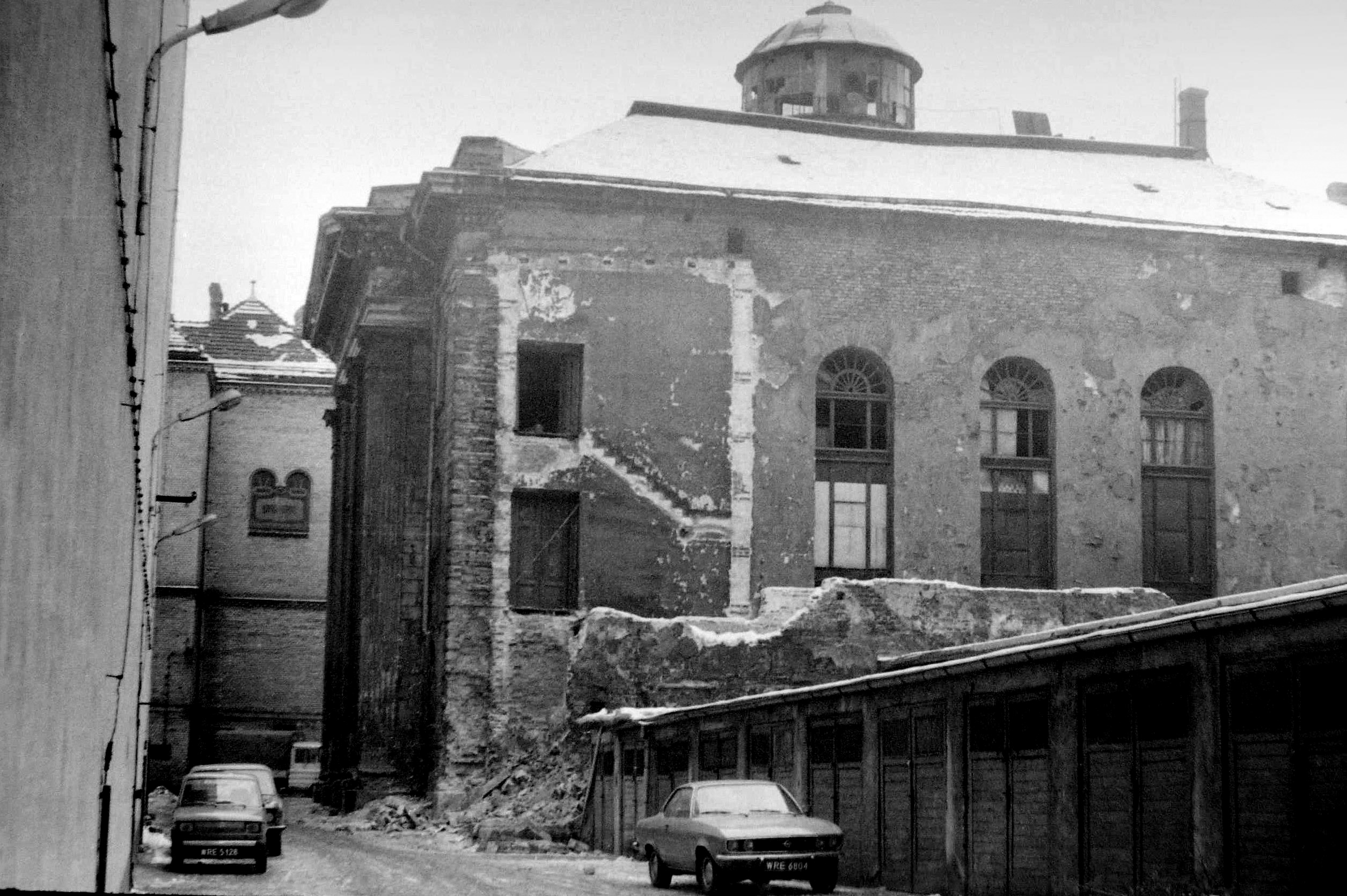
Synagogue in 1979

During the Kristallnacht the interior of the building was destroyed by the Sturmabteilung who also tore up the Torah scrolls. On the same night, the New Synagogue, which served the city's Liberal community was burned to the ground by the Nazi paramilitary groups. The White Stork synagogue, which at the time served Conservative Jews escaped that fate, because it was located close to other buildings and the participants in the pogrom were concerned that any fire would spread to non-Jewish structures.

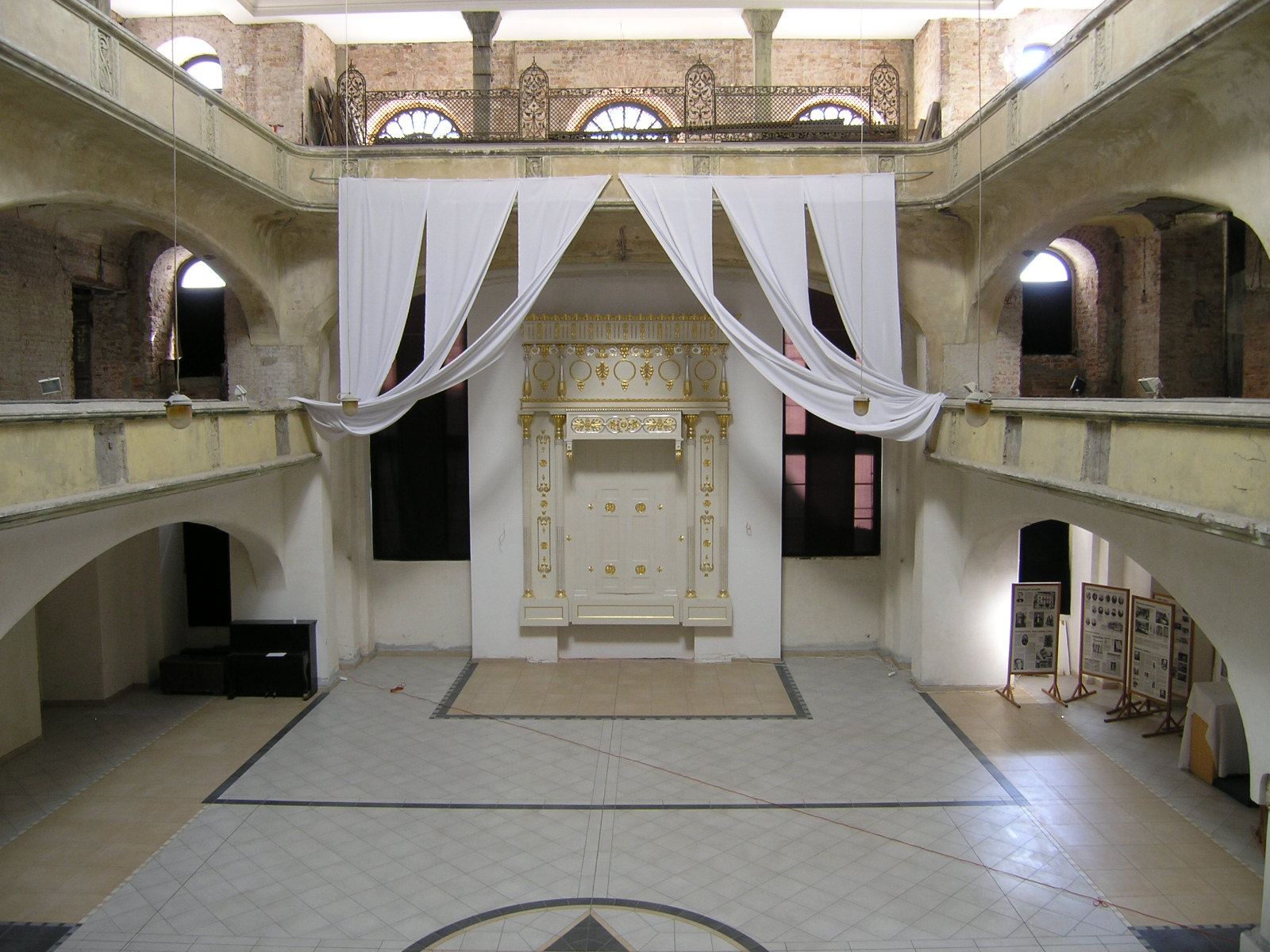
Aron ha-Kodesh

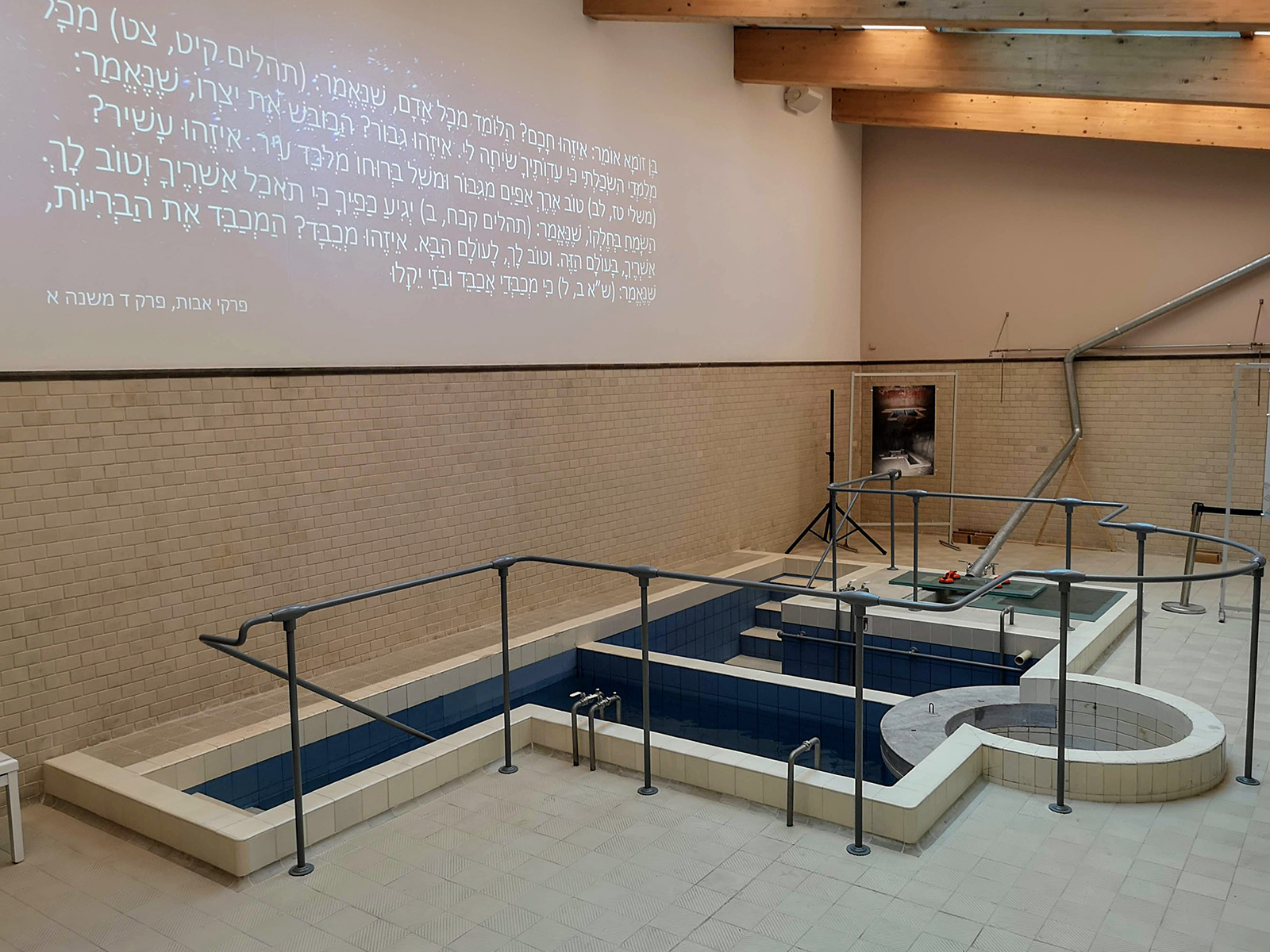
Restored Mikveh (ritual bath) in 2019.

The synagogue was renovated by the city's Jewish community and became a place of worship for Jews of all sects until 1943. In that year, the Nazis took over the building and turned it into a warehouse for stolen Jewish property. The city's Jewish inhabitants were rounded up and sent to death camps, with the synagogue's courtyard serving as a collection point, in the same way as Umschlagplatz in Warsaw.

After the war, the city's Polish authorities turned over the building to the new Jewish community in the city. It functioned as both a community center and a place of worship, despite underfunding, the emigration of Wroclaw's Jews abroad, and repeated vandalism by so-called "unknown perpetrators" ("nieznani sprawcy" a Communist era Polish code word for individuals committing crimes on behalf of the secret communist police). After the 1968 Polish political crisis, which saw a Communist-sponsored anti-Semitic campaign, most of the city's Jews left Poland and shortly thereafter, religious ceremonies in the synagogue were suspended.

The synagogue was in use until 1974, when the authorities expropriated it and gave it to the University of Wrocław, which used it as a library. In 1989, the university transferred the building to the Musical Academy. It was purchased by a private firm in 1995.

=== Restoration ===
It was subsequently returned to the Jewish community and was under renovation for over a decade. The renovations were completed and the synagogue rededicated in 2010. There are plans for the synagogue to be used as a Jewish museum.

In 2008, the 14th Dalai Lama visited the synagogue.

On October 11, 2012, during the local Pride parade, a small window of the synagogue was broken with a stone thrown by an unidentified vandal believed to have belonged to anti-gay sympathizers of the far-right National Revival that were protesting on the sidelines. Police analyzed the video, but no arrest was made. Authorities assessed the incident as a simple act of vandalism.

In 2014, it celebrated its first ordination of four Reform rabbis and three Reform cantors since the Second World War. The German Foreign Minister attended the ceremony.

== See also ==
- Chronology of Jewish Polish history
- Four Denominations District
- History of the Jews in Poland
- List of active synagogues in Poland
