= European Council on Tolerance and Reconciliation =

European Council on Tolerance and Reconciliation logo

The European Council on Tolerance and Reconciliation (ECTR) is a non-governmental organization that was established in Paris, France on 7 October 2008 to monitor tolerance in Europe. The chairman of the council is former British Prime Minister Tony Blair (until 2013 - former President of Poland Aleksander Kwaśniewski), and the President of the council is Viatcheslav Moshe Kantor. Sebastian Kurz, former chancellor of Austria, joined the council as a co-chairman in January 2022.

== Objectives and members ==
The ECTR prepares practical recommendations for governments and international organisations to improve interreligious and interethnic relations in Europe. The council is focused on fighting xenophobia, antisemitism, and racial discrimination in the modern world.

The ECTR includes members such as:

- José María Aznar, former Prime Minister of Spain
- Erhard Busek, former Vice-Chancellor of the Republic of Austria
- George Vassiliou, former President of the Republic of Cyprus
- Vaira Vīķe-Freiberga, former President of the Republic of Latvia
- Rita Süssmuth, former Speaker of the German Bundestag
- Igor Ivanov, former Foreign Minister and Secretary of the Security Council of the Russian Federation, Professor of MGIMO-University
- Milan Kučan, former President of Slovenia
- Alfred Moisiu, former President of Albania
- Göran Persson, former Prime Minister of Sweden
- Vilma Trajkovska, President of the Boris Trajkovski International Foundation
- Sebastian Kurz, former Chancellor of the Republic of Austria.

== Secure Tolerance ==
ECTR President Viatcheslav Moshe Kantor described this concept in his Manifesto on Secure Tolerance.

== Activities ==
=== Medal of Tolerance ===
In 2008, the ECTR established a European tolerance prize called the Medal of Tolerance. The purpose of the prize is to honour the extraordinary creative achievements of outstanding activists who promote tolerance and reconciliation in Europe, as well as fighting xenophobia and racial and religious discrimination. The Medal of Tolerance may also be awarded to the families of individuals who have lost their lives in the struggle against extremism and intolerance.

The First European Medal of Tolerance was conferred in 2010 on the King of Spain Juan Carlos I for his lifelong dedication and devotion to the issue of tolerance and political reconciliation. The second and the third European Medals of Tolerance have been conferred on President of Croatia Ivo Josipović and Ex-President of Serbia Boris Tadic in Brussels, in recognition of the Balkan statesmen's "significant contribution to promoting, seeking, safeguarding or maintaining Tolerance and Reconciliation on the European continent". In 2015 Samuel Eto'o, a famous football-player, and anti-racist FARE Network have been awarded with the European Medal of Tolerance for their fight against racism in football.

Film director Andrei Konchalovsky has been awarded with the European Medal of Tolerance for 2016 "for his cultural achievements focused on preserving the tragic memory of the past including his film "Paradise" (2016).

The European Medal of Tolerance for the 2017 has been awarded to the Prince of Monaco Albert II for "his exceptional personal leadership and inspiration to advance truth, tolerance and historical reconciliation."

=== "Towards Reconciliation" ===
The ECTR was one of the initiators and organisers of the international conference "Towards Reconciliation. Experiences, Techniques and Opportunities for Europe" held on 24–25 October 2010, in Dubrovnik, Croatia. The gathering brought together current and former heads of European nations to collect European experience in reconciliation, and offer them to the Balkan nations.

The ECTR held a Round Table Meeting in Moscow on 25 October 2011. Russian and international experts discussed issues of paramount importance connected with the current status, aspects and promotion of tolerance in Europe and in Russia. The experts also touched on such topics as the boundaries of tolerance, nuclear tolerance and secure tolerance in order to prevent a clash of civilisations. The ECTR's initiative to establish a Centre for Tolerance and Security at a leading European university was also discussed at this meeting.

=== Forum of World Society in Prague, 26 January 2015 ===
The European Council on Tolerance and Reconciliation has been a supporting organizer of the Forum of World Society, held within the 4th International Forum „Let My People Live!” in Prague.

The Prague Forum gathered around 500 representatives of European civic society, Speakers and members of Parliaments, journalists etc. It included a Forum of the World Society – 3 intensive debates focused on the Role of Media and Civic Society, Role of Legislation and Politicians in Combating Political Extremism, neo-nazism and Islamic radicalism.

=== Round Table in Monaco "Tackling Extremism and Intolerance in a Diverse Society" ===
The European Council for Tolerance and Reconciliation held in March 2018 in Monte Carlo, Monaco a Round Table discussion "Tackling Extremism and Intolerance in a Diverse Society". The conference was held under the Patronage of the Secretary General of the Council of Europe, Mr. Thornbjorn Jagland.

It gathered political, academic and NGO participants from 22 countries to address the threat of radicalisation and issues surrounding the challenges to tolerance in Europe. The three key issues discussed were political radicalisation, online hate speech and integrating immigrants in diverse societies.

=== Kantor Prize for Secure Tolerance ===
In 2018 the ECTR announced the establishment of the Kantor Prize for Secure Tolerance and ECTR Research Grants.

=== A European Model Law for the Promotion of Tolerance and the Suppression of Intolerance ===
The Model National Statute for the Promotion of Tolerance is a document prepared by a group of experts of the European Council on Tolerance and Reconciliation (ECTR), which regulates the legal relationship in the sphere of tolerance. The Model Statute is designed for adoption by the respective national legislatures of European States, in order to confirm and clarify their adherence to the principle of tolerance.

The purpose of the Model Statute is to fill a vacuum: although all European States are committed to the principle of tolerance, nowhere is this principle defined in binding legal terms. The principal challenge in preparing the Model Statute was to go beyond rhetoric and generalities, spelling out concrete and enforceable obligations that ensure tolerance and stamp out intolerance. The ECTR has presented this document in a series of meetings and seminars with international organizations, including the Council of Europe and the OSCE. As a result, there is currently a joint ECTR-European Council task force which is working on its implementation.

In 2012 Viatcheslav Moshe Kantor introduced ECTR's proposals for a general law of tolerance, which was presented at an official ceremony in the presence of European Parliament President Martin Schulz, as well as the two recipients of the European Medal of Tolerance. Expanding on the Model Law for Promotion of Tolerance, a version of which it seeks to make mandatory across all 27 member states, Chair of the Task Force in charge of its inception Yoram Dinstein said that "tolerance is the glue that cements together the bond between distinct groups in a single society".

On 17 September 2013, a subcommittee of the ECTR, composed of Yoram Dinstein, Ugo Genesio, Rein Müllerson, Daniel Thürer and Rüdiger Wolfrum presented "a European framework national statute for the promotion of tolerance submitted with a view to being enacted by the legislatures of European states" to the Committee on Civil Liberties, Justice and Home Affairs of the European Parliament. Section 8 states that "the government shall ensure that (a) Schools, from the primary level upwards, will introduce courses encouraging students to accept diversity and promoting a climate of tolerance as regards the qualities and cultures of others." While Section 9 (a) states: "The government shall ensure that public broadcasting (television and radio) stations will devote a prescribed percentage of their program to promoting a climate of tolerance."
