= Museum of Avant-Garde Mastery =

Private museum Muscovite, Russia

The Museum of Avant-Garde Mastery (MAGMA) is a continually renewed collection of hundreds of artworks, including paintings by famous Russian artists of Jewish origin, photographs, masterpieces of sculpture and graphic design. MAGMA’s collection includes works by Valentin Serov, Léon Bakst, Marc Chagall, El Lissitzky, Chaïm Soutine, Amedeo Modigliani, Erik Bulatov, Ilya Kabakov, etc. The Museum was established in 2001. The current MAGMA President is Viatcheslav Moshe Kantor.

The collection also contains works by famous 20th-century photographers Lev Ivanov, Ivan Shagin, and Lev Borodulin, as well as masterpieces by contemporary western artists, in particular well-known photos by Helmut Newton.

The Museum’s mission lies in disseminating the ideas of tolerance and reconciliation in the world and uniting humanity to face the challenges posed by terrorism, xenophobia and anti-Semitism. MAGMA’s collection shows the vital importance of the cultural component in modern life and the significant role art plays in uniting society. According to MAGMA’s main ideologist Viatcheslav Moshe Kantor, “It is a tolerant environment that promotes art and vice versa. This is the specific message which our museum is sending humanity, and I will be happy if this message is heard”.

In June 2009, MAGMA’s first exhibition, called “My Homeland is within My Soul: Art without Borders,” opened in the Palace of Nations in Geneva, Switzerland, which now hosts the UN European Office. The Palace of Nations was selected as the venue for the exhibition, reflecting its longstanding role as a centre for international diplomacy, security, and multilateral cooperation, and its history as the headquarters of major international organisations.

The exhibition received widespread coverage in European and Russian media.

The second exhibition of the MAGMA Museum called "My Homeland Is Within My Soul" took its place at the Pushkin State Museum of Fine Arts in Moscow from December 2013 until February 2014.

In 2018, the President of the Russian Academy of Arts and People’s Artist of the URSS Zurab Tsereteli , officially awarded the robe and diploma of Honorary Member of the Russian Academy of Arts to the President of the Museum of Avant-Garde Mastery Viatcheslav Kantor.

== Media on the MAGMA exhibition ==
1. Russian Billionaire Kantor Reveals Chagall, Rothko Paintings, Bloomberg, June 11, 2009.
2. Jewish art exhibit joins fight against racism, Ynetnews.com, June 14, 2009.
3. Les trésors d'un oligarque russe sortis de l'ombre, Le Monde, June 14, 2009.
