= Yakov Vinichenko =

Soviet soldier

Yakov Ivanovich Vinichenko
- Born: 18 October 1925; Tyshkov, Vinnytsia Oblast
- Military career
- Allegiance: Soviet Union
- Awards: Order of the Patriotic War

Yakov Ivanovich Vinichenko (Russian: Виниченко Яков Иванович; born 18 October 1925) is a Soviet World War II veteran.

Vinichenko was born in Tsyhkov on 18 October 1925. Drafted into the war in 1941. In 1945, he served in the 107th rifle division that liberated Auschwitz. By the end of the war he was as a commander of a machine gun company. Has suffered two serious and two minor wounds. Vinichenko was awarded the Order of the Patriotic War of the 1st degree, along with numerous medals.
