= Viatcheslav Kantor =

Russian businessman (born 1953)

- Вячеслав Кантор
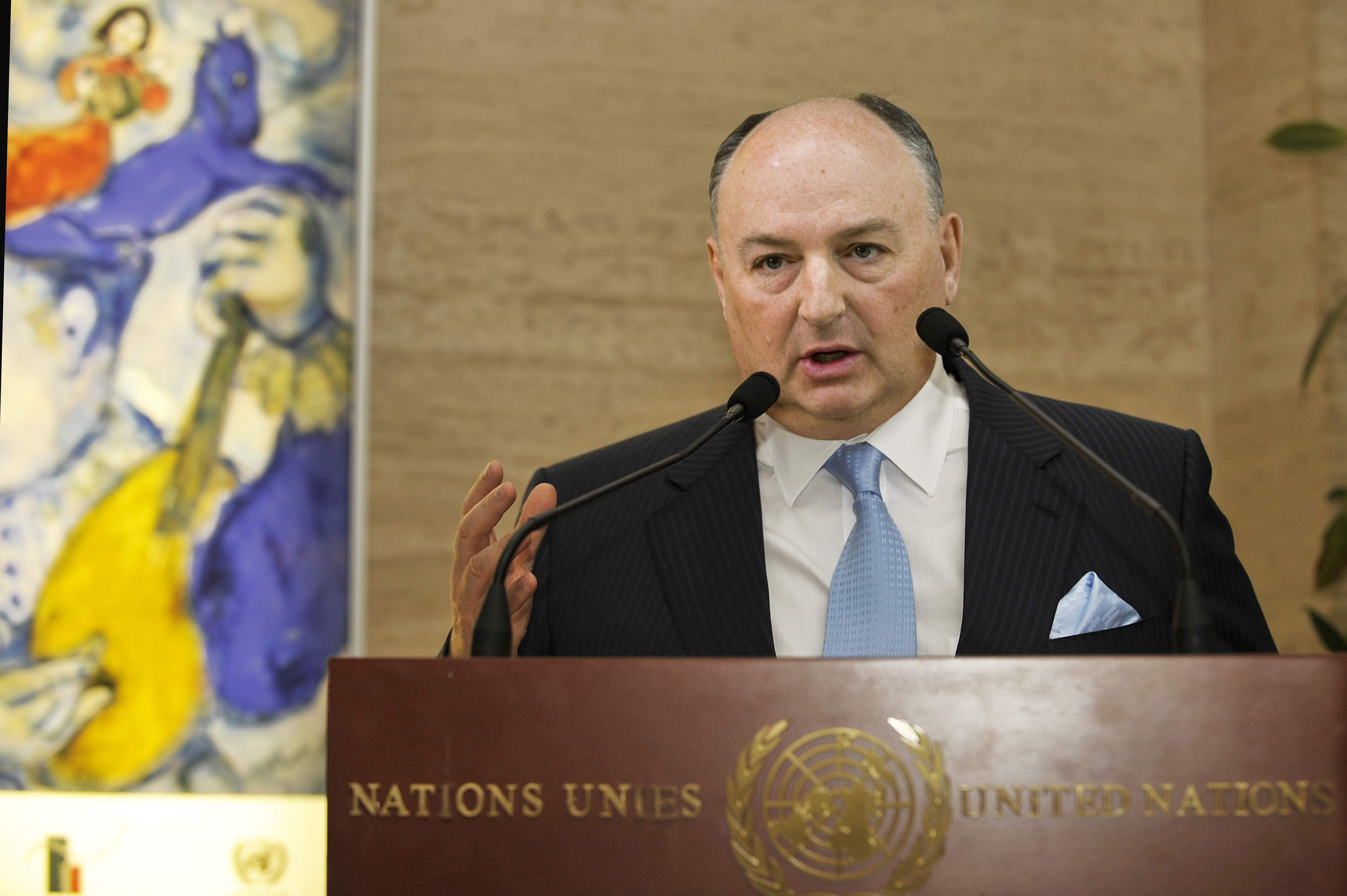
- Kantor in 2009
- Born: Viatcheslav Moshe Kantor; Вячеслав Моше Кантор; 8 September 1953 (age 72); Moscow, Russian SFSR, Soviet Union
- Education: Moscow Aviation Institute (diploma, 1976); Moscow Aviation Institute (PhD, 1981)
- Occupation: Businessman
- Spouse: Anna Kantor
- Website: moshekantor.com

Viatcheslav Moshe Kantor (Russian: Вячеслав Моше Кантор, born 8 September 1953) is a Russian, British and Israeli businessman described as an oligarch, who serves as President of the European Jewish Congress (EJC), President of the World Holocaust Forum Foundation (WHF) and Chairman of the European Jewish Fund (EJF).

Since the Russian invasion of Ukraine, he has been placed on various sanctions lists as a result of which he had temporarily stopped leading the EJC. In 2025, he was removed from the EU and Swiss sanctions list and was elected President of the European Jewish Congress for a fifth term.

== Early life and education ==
Kantor was born in 1953 and spent his early years in Moscow. He obtained a degree from the Moscow Aviation Institute (MAI) in 1976 and did research for MAI and NPO Spektr. In 1981, he completed his PhD in Spacecraft Automatic Control Systems. He worked as a scientist and headed one of MAI's research laboratories.

== Career ==
In 1989–1993, Kantor was Director General of Intelmas, a telecoms company. In 1996–2000 he was an economic adviser to the Chairman of the Federation Council of the Russian Federal Assembly.

Kantor gained his wealth through leading the Acron Group, one of the largest mineral fertilizer producers and distributors in the world. As of 2022, he was the company's largest shareholder. He also owns shares in Grupa Azoty, a major Polish chemical industry company. In 2025, Forbes estimated Kantor's net worth at US$9.5 billion.

Kantor has close ties to the Vladimir Putin regime in Russia.

Kantor was sanctioned by association by the British government in March 2022 in the wake of the Russian invasion of Ukraine. Consequently University College School decided to review the name of its sports pavilion, which was named after Kantor.

On 8 April 2022 the European Union imposed sanctions against Viatcheslav Kantor, although on 14 March 2025, the Council of the European Union has deleted Kantor from the sanctions list.

After that, Switzerland has also announced the de-listing of Kantor from its sanctions list since March 18, 2025.

== Civic activities ==
Kantor served as President of the European Jewish Congress in 2007–2022, and was re-elected President of the EJC for a fifth term in May 2025, during the EJC General Assembly in Jerusalem, gathering almost two-thirds of the vote of its delegates, representatives of the European national Jewish communities.

The EJC, the largest secular organization representing the interests of European Jewry, is an influential, international public association representing 2.5 million Jews across the European continent in 42 national Jewish communities.

In 2021, he was reelected Chairman of the Policy Council of the World Jewish Congress for the third time Kantor is a Vice President of the Jewish Leadership Council. In 2010, he established the Kantor Center for the Study of Contemporary European Jewry at Tel Aviv University. In 2019, Yad Vashem nominated Moshe Kantor as Chancellor of the council, and before it he served as its Member of Directorate since 2010. Kantor was President of the Russian Jewish Congress (RJC) in 2005–2009. He founded and headed the World Holocaust Forum (WHF) in 2005. He is a founder and chairman of the European Jewish Fund (EJF), established in 2006.

He has chaired the World Holocaust Forum Foundation. In 2020, the World Holocaust Forum organized by Kantor came under controversy after Vladimir Putin was allowed to give a speech that distorted the history of the Soviet Union in World War II. The forum refused to allow Polish President Andrzej Duda to have a speaking slot.

He is the founder and president of President of the European Council on Tolerance and Reconciliation (ECTR). Kantor drafted and has repeatedly attempted to pass the ECTR's proposed European law known as the Model National Statute for the Promotion of Tolerance, one of the most sweeping hate speech laws ever proposed in Europe.

In 2007, Kantor founded and was elected president of the International Luxembourg Forum on Preventing Nuclear Catastrophe, an international non-governmental organisation uniting leading world-renowned experts on nuclear non-proliferation, materials and delivery vehicles. The Forum was established pursuant to a decision of the International Conference held in Luxembourg on 24–25 May 2007. The conference was attended by over 50 renowned experts from 14 countries, including Sergey Kirienko, Director General of the Rosatom State Atomic Energy Corporation, Mohamed ElBaradei, Director General of the International Atomic Energy Agency (IAEA), Nikolay Laverov, Academician and Vice President of the Russian Academy of Sciences (RAS), William Perry, former Secretary of the U.S. Department of Defense, and Hans Blix, Chairman of the Weapons of Mass Destruction Commission and former Director General of the IAEA.

== Personal life ==
Kantor is a citizen of Russia, the United Kingdom and Israel. He is married to Anna Kantor and has children.

Kantor bought a violin made by the Italian violin maker Riccardo Antoniazzi in 1912. The violin has been given as a First Prize of the 2nd International Violinists Vladimir Spivakov Contest. Its price was $140,000.

Kantor was a trustee of the Anna Freud Centre (London, UK), but was removed from this position after the Russian Invasion of Ukraine. Kantor was previously a patron of King Solomon High School (London, UK). Kantor supported the development of the school which is a Jewish Comprehensive school based in Redbridge.

Kantor has been a benefactor of the Royal Opera House Covent Garden Foundation since 2013, in which capacity he has facilitated various projects.

Kantor was appointed Life Governor and Trustee of the King Edward VII's Hospital in London after his charitable foundation funded the redevelopment of the site adjacent to the hospital, Macintosh House, which was subsequently renamed the Kantor Medical Centre.

Kantor is president of the Museum of Avant-Garde Mastery (MAGMA), founded in 2001 in Moscow on Kantor's initiative.

In 2018, President of the Russian Academy of Arts and People's Artist of the URSS Zurab Tsereteli officially awarded Kantor as the President of MAGMA Museum with the robe and diploma of Honorary Member of the Russian Academy of Arts.

== Honors and awards ==
Kantor received the following government awards: Order of Friendship (Russia, 1998), Officer's Cross of the Order of Merit (Poland, 2005), Order of Prince Yaroslav the Wise (Ukraine, 2006), Order of Leopold (Belgium, 2009), Chevalier of the National Order of the Legion of Honour (France, 2012), Knight's Grand Cross of the Order of Merit of the Italian Republic (Italy, 2013), Grand Cross with honours of the National Order of Merit (Romania, 2014), Officer of the National Order of the Legion of Honour (France, 2014, presented in 2015), The Order of Honour (Russia, 2016), Officer of the Order of the Crown (Belgium, 2020) and Grand Decoration of Honour in Gold for Services to the Republic of Austria (Austria, 2021).

He is an honorary citizen of Veliky Novgorod (1997) and Honorary Member of the Russian Academy of Arts.

In addition, he received an honorary doctorate from Tel-Aviv University (2004) and the Medal of Merit "Deserved for Tolerance" by the Ecumenical Foundation Tolerance (2011).

Kantor has been recognized for seven consecutive years as one of the '50 Most Influential Jews in the World'.

In 1997, Viatcheslav Kantor was named Honorary Citizen of Veliky Novgorod.

== See also ==
- European Jewish Congress
- World Jewish Congress
- European Council on Tolerance and Reconciliation
- International Luxembourg Forum on Preventing Nuclear Catastrophe
- European Jewish Fund
- World Holocaust Forum
- Museum of Avant-Garde Mastery
