= European Jewish Congress =

Jewish political organisation

The European Jewish Congress (EJC) was founded in 1986. It is based in Brussels, with offices in Paris, Strasbourg, Berlin and Budapest. It is a representative body of democratically elected European Jewish communities throughout Europe.

== Overview ==
Affiliated to the World Jewish Congress, the EJC works with national governments, European Union institutions and the Council of Europe. The European Jewish Congress is one of the most influential international public associations and a large secular organisation representing more than 2.5 million Jews in Europe. It is an umbrella organisation for 42 national Jewish communities on this continent. The primary mission of the EJC is to promote European democracy based on good relations between neighbours, mutual understanding and tolerance. The EJC maintains co-operation with European governments, leading international institutions and European integration associations, including the United Nations, European Union, the Organization for Security and Co-operation in Europe. It has a participatory status with the Council of Europe.

The EJC intends to protect human rights, fight xenophobia and anti-Semitism, promote interfaith dialogue, implement cultural and educational programmes, and remember the Holocaust and other events that killed millions of people.

To meet these goals, the EJC has initiated and organised several large international projects, in particular the Let My People Live! international forums. The First Forum of the series was held in Kraków, Poland in January 2005 to commemorate 60 years since liberation of Auschwitz; the Second Forum took place in Kyiv in September 2006 to mark 65 years since the Babi Yar tragedy. The forums were widely supported by leading international organisations, including the Council of Europe and the Council of Europe Parliamentary Assembly, as well as senior politicians from countries including Russia, the United States, Germany, Israel, Poland and Ukraine. The next Let My People Live! Forum, this one to commemorate 70 years since die Kristallnacht, has been held in Kraków.

On 25 January 2011 at the European Parliament in Brussels on the eve of the International Holocaust Remembrance Day there took place a commemoration meeting devoted to the memory of the Holocaust. It was timed to the 66th anniversary of the liberation of concentration camp Auschwitz-Birkenau by the Soviet Army. The European Jewish Congress was one of the principal organizers of this event.

Another important issue on the EJC's agenda is preventing nuclear terrorism. The EJC was a co-organiser of the International Conference on Preventing Nuclear Catastrophe, which took place in Luxembourg this May and brought together a unique team of more than 50 experts in nuclear non-proliferation from 14 countries, led by Director General of the International Atomic Energy Agency Mohammed ElBaradei. Taking into account the level of participants, the conference was the largest and most authoritative gathering to discuss issues of nuclear safety within the past decade.

The EJC's head office is located in Brussels, with branches operating in Berlin, Paris, Budapest and Strasburg.

The President of the European Jewish Congress is elected every two years renewable by a "General Assembly" of Jewish community representatives and works in consortium with an elected "Executive" of community presidents.

In 2007-2022, Moshe Kantor served as President of the EJC.

Dr Ariel Muzicant, who has served as Vice-President of the EJC since 2012, was unanimously appointed Interim President of the European Jewish Congress on 11 April 2022.

In May, 2025, Moshe Kantor was re-elected President of the EJC for a fifth term, during the EJC General Assembly in Jerusalem, gathering almost two-thirds of the vote of its delegates, representatives of the European national Jewish communities.

== Primary objectives ==
The EJC lists as its primary objectives the following on its website:

- To combat the resurgence of anti-Semitism through education, justice and security, in co-operation with governments and European institutions.
- To promote a balanced European policy towards Israel and the Middle East, and to assist in the construction of a healthy dialogue between Europeans and Israelis.
- To foster inter-religious dialogue and understanding.
- To ensure memory and education of the Holocaust.
- To contribute to a democratic European society based on peace, understanding and tolerance.
- To assist in the revitalisation of the once rich Jewish life in Central and Eastern Europe.
- To counteract assimilation of the European Jewish population

== 2006 report ==
In 2006 the congress released a report detailing a new wave of antisemitic incidents in most of Western Europe in the wake of the 2006 Israel-Lebanon conflict, in contrast to neutral or pro-Israel sentiment in the former Eastern bloc as well as in Denmark.

The report cited:

- The first instances of antisemitism in Turkey since the change of regime in 2002;
- 83 instances of antisemitism in Austria from April through August 2006, compared to 50 in the same period of 2005;
- 61 instances of antisemitism in France from April through August 2006, compared to 34 in the same period of 2005;
- Normalisation of antisemitic political and media rhetoric in Greece after the conflict.

== See also ==
- History of the Jews in Europe
