= Jagiellonian University Medical College =

Medical school in Poland

- Collegium Medicum Uniwersytetu Jagiellońskiego
- Latin: Universitas Iagellonica Cracoviensis Collegium Medicum
- Type: Public Medical School
- Established: 12 May 1364
- Parent institution: Jagiellonian University
- Rector: prof. dr hab. Piotr Jedynak
- Academic staff: 1,552
- Students: Totals: MD – 720; PhD – 252; DDS – 207; Master's – 78
- Location: Kraków, Poland; 50°03′43″N 19°56′00″E
- Campus: Urban
- Website: http://www.cm-uj.krakow.pl/

Jagiellonian University Medical College is the medical school of Jagiellonian University, a public research institute in Kraków, Poland. It was established by King Casimir III of Poland in 1364, making it the 12th oldest medical school in the world. Jagiellonian University Medical College (JUMC) provides patient care, medical education, and research training through its various clinical affiliates and research institutes.

== Jagiellonian University ==
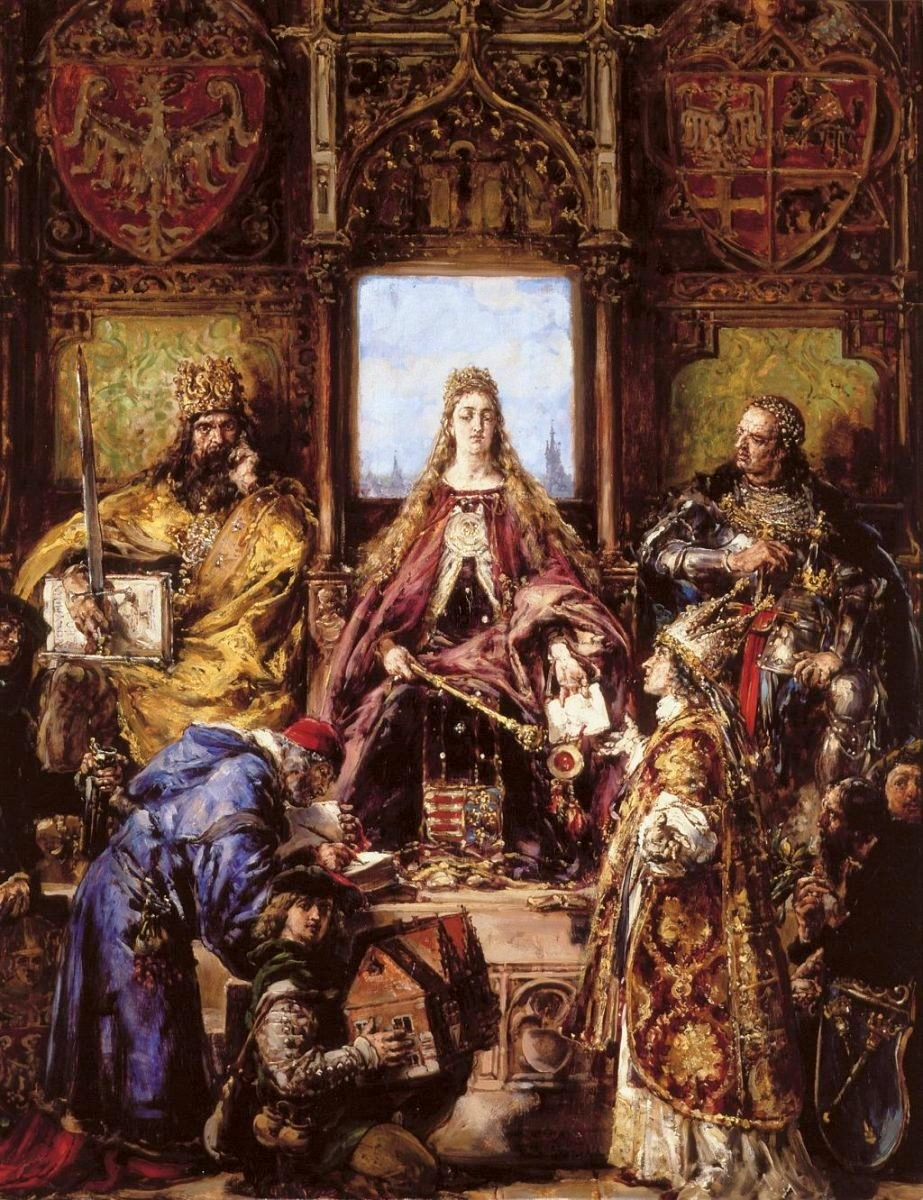
The founding of the University in 1364 AD, painted by Jan Matejko(1838–1893)

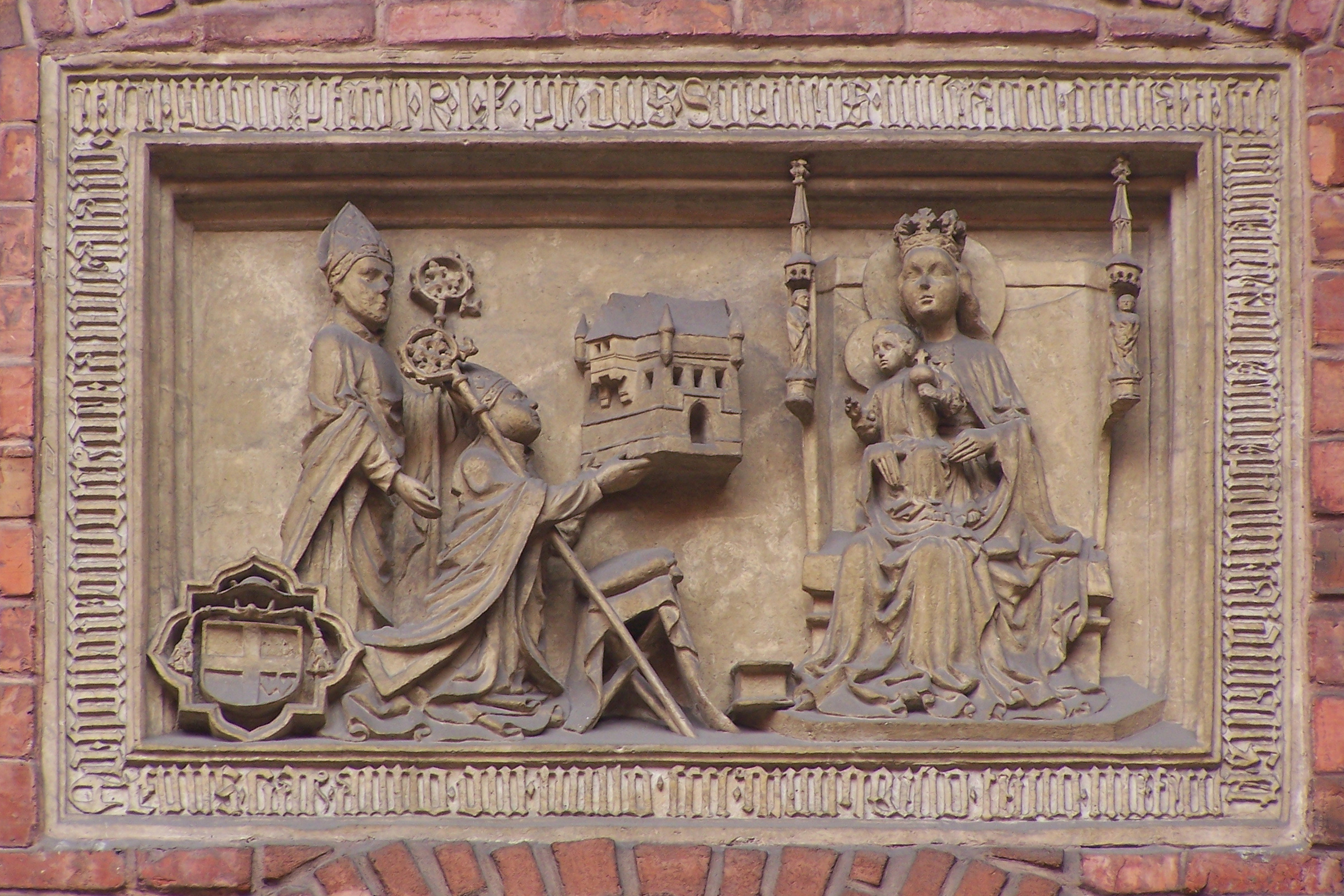
Zbigniew Oleśnicki, Bishop of Kraków

Jagiellonian University is the oldest institution of higher education in Poland. Established in 1364 by King Casimir III the Great, it is the second oldest university in Central-Eastern Europe, preceded by the Charles University in Prague, which was founded in 1348. Called Studium Generale in its early years, it was modeled after the Universities of Bologna and Padua and was initially composed of three faculties: Liberal Arts, Medicine, and Law. After its restoration in 1400, changes to the academy's statute made it more resemble the Paris Sorbonne. For over 600 years, many prominent Poles and Europeans received their education within the walls of this university. It was here that Nicolaus Copernicus studied, and in 1578 Walenty Fontana delivered the first academic lecture based on Copernicus' heliocentric theory, an inconceivable notion to many scholars at the time. In 1938, Karol Wojtyła began his studies in Polish philology at Jagiellonian University, interrupted by the outbreak of World War II, when occupying forces closed the university. During the War, he actively participated in classes organized by the underground university. Upon taking Holy Orders and returning from his doctoral studies in Rome, he received his post-doctoral degree from Jagiellonian University in 1953, continuing to work at the university until 1954. In 1983, already as pope, he was honored by university authorities with an Honorary Doctorate.

After Poland regained independence following World War I, new institutions of higher education were established and older institutions were able to recover their Polish identity. With its already famous university, Kraków already possessed adequate intellectual potential to help these new institutions.

Despite numerous challenges, particularly economic, sustained scientific development continued at the university until the outbreak of World War II and Nazi German occupation. On November 6, 1939, in room number 26 at Collegium Novum, the teaching staff was gathered on orders by SS-Sturmbannführer Bruno Muller, who accused university authorities of illegal activity. On these false charges, all those present were arrested and deported to the Sachsenhausen concentration camp. Despite this grievous tragedy and loss of its greatest luminaries of science, on the initiative of Professor Mieczysław Małecki, Jagiellonian University established an underground university in 1942, the Rector of which was Professor Władysław Szafer. After World War II, notwithstanding a shortage of teaching staff, the university resumed its functioning in 1945. However, despite the good will and sincere enthusiasm of all academic teachers and students, these efforts were soon stifled by ever-increasing political interference.

Today Jagiellonian University combines tradition with the challenges of the modern world. In compliance with the principles of the Bologna Process, over 46 000 students study in 15 faculties on all three levels of study: Bachelor's, Master's, and Doctoral. One may choose to study from nearly a hundred majors. The European Credit Transfer and Accumulation System (ECTS) enables students to combine their studies at Jagiellonian University with coursework from other European universities.

Teaching staff includes over 3600 academic instructors, 500 of whom hold the title of Professor.

== Faculty of Medicine ==
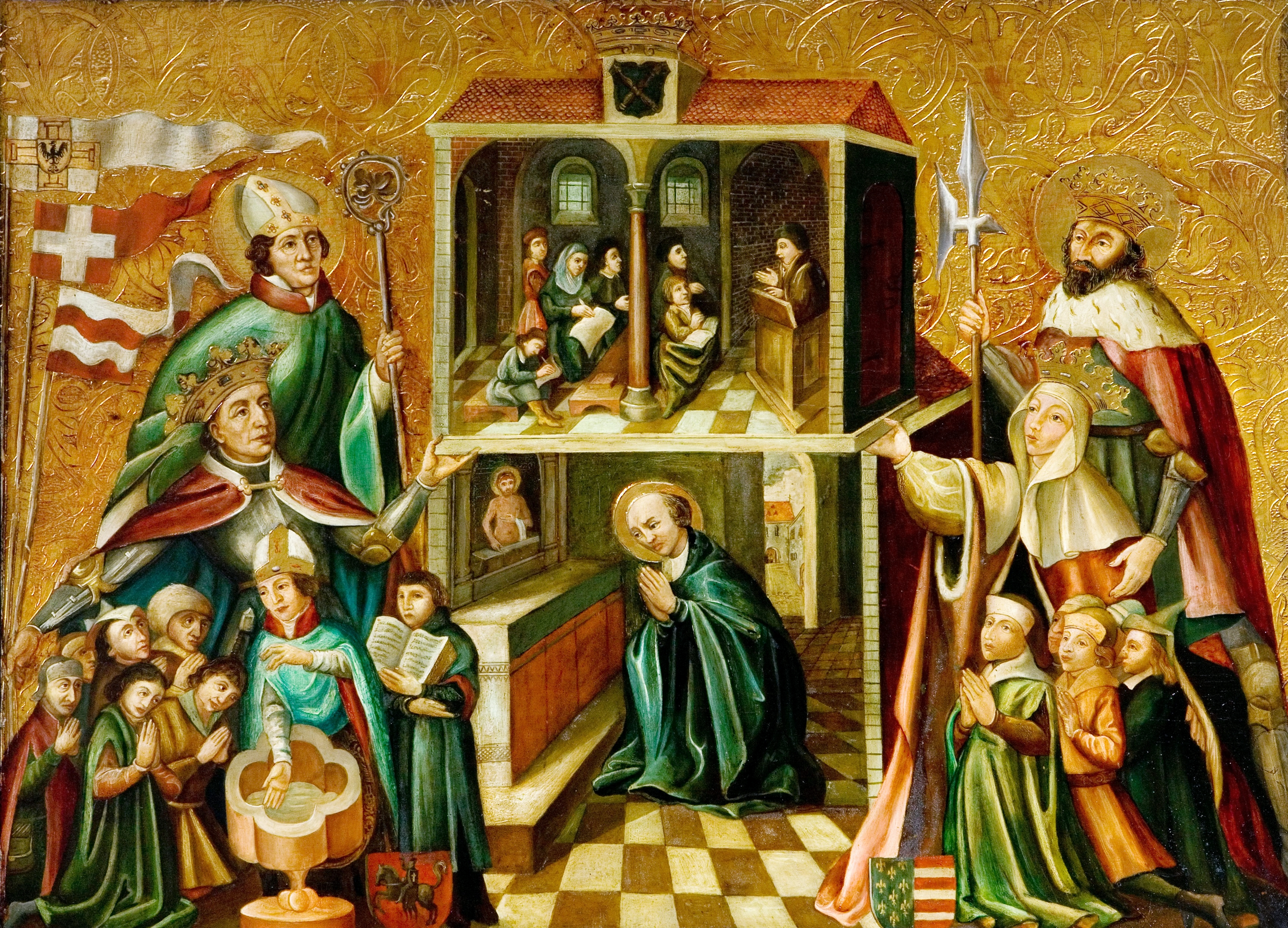
Founders of the University

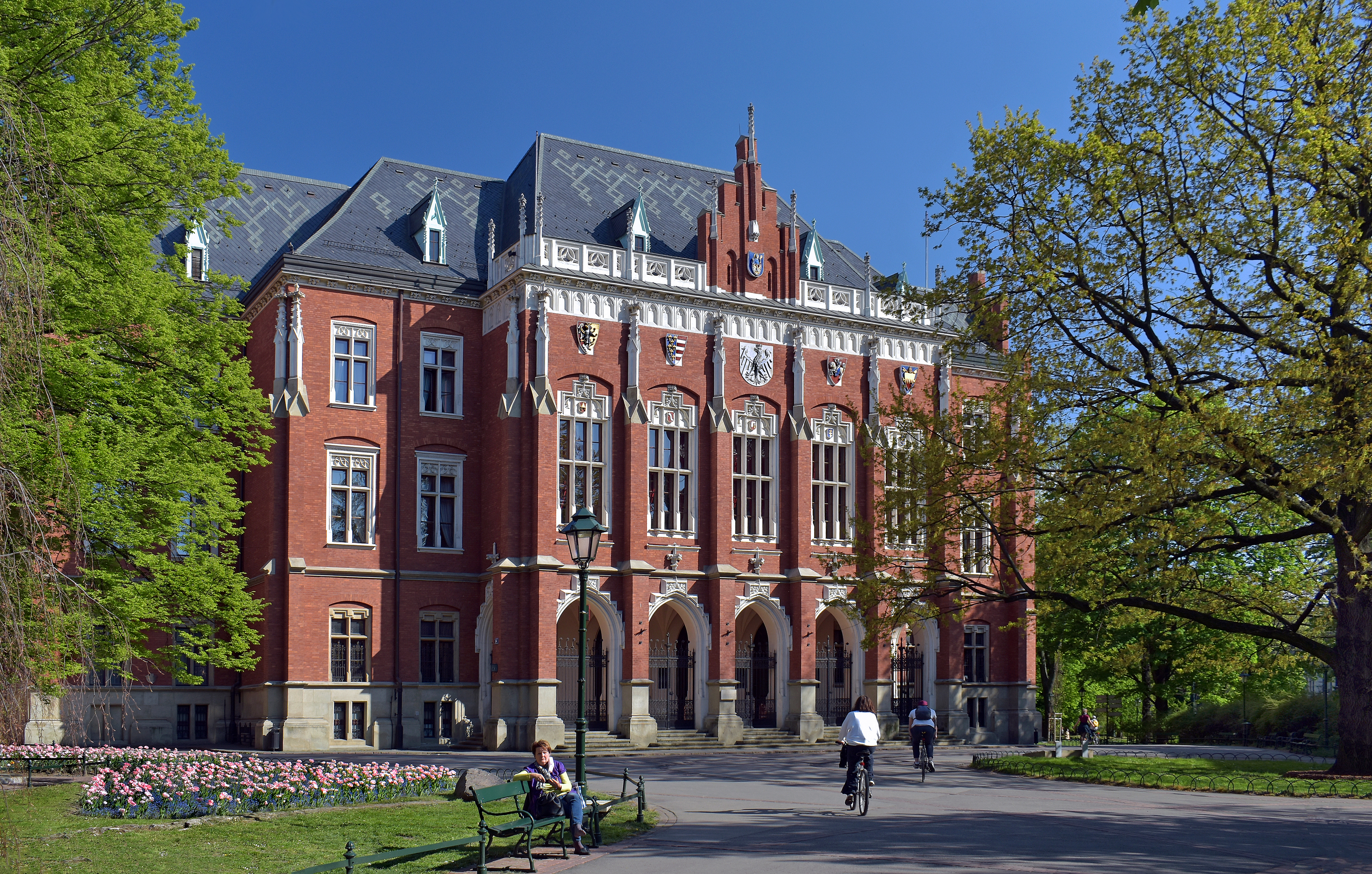
Collegium Novum

When King Casimir III the Great in 1364 established the University of Kraków, there were initially three faculties. The Faculty of Medicine included two types of professors: Professor of Medicine, or lector ordinarius in medicines, and presumably a Professor of Astronomy, who would lecture on astrology, which for a long time remained an inextricable part of medicine. All lectures took place in the Royal Castle on Wawel Hill.

King Władysław Jagiełło, using jewels donated by his wife, Queen Jadwiga, financed the restoration of the University in 1400. Stanisław of Skarbimierz, the first rector of the university, stressed the importance of the Faculty of Medicine already in his inauguration speech. Soon after the restoration process, renowned Polish and foreign scholars began to arrive at the university. Jan Kro of Chociebuż (Johannes Kro de Kostebus) was one of its first professors, as well as the first physician to be chosen as rector of the university, a position he assumed in 1419. Other notable scholars include Jan of Pawia (Johannes de Saccis de Pavia), who introduced the first statute of the Faculty of Medicine in 1433, Marcin Król of Żurawica, and Piotr Gaszowiec of Loćmierz, who, in addition to medicine, displayed great interest in astronomy and astrology.

At the time, each physician who practiced in Kraków, nationality notwithstanding, was obliged to teach as a lecturer of medicine, or lector in medicines. Owing to this fact, already in the 15th century, the teaching staff at the Faculty of Medicine numbered nearly 50 members.

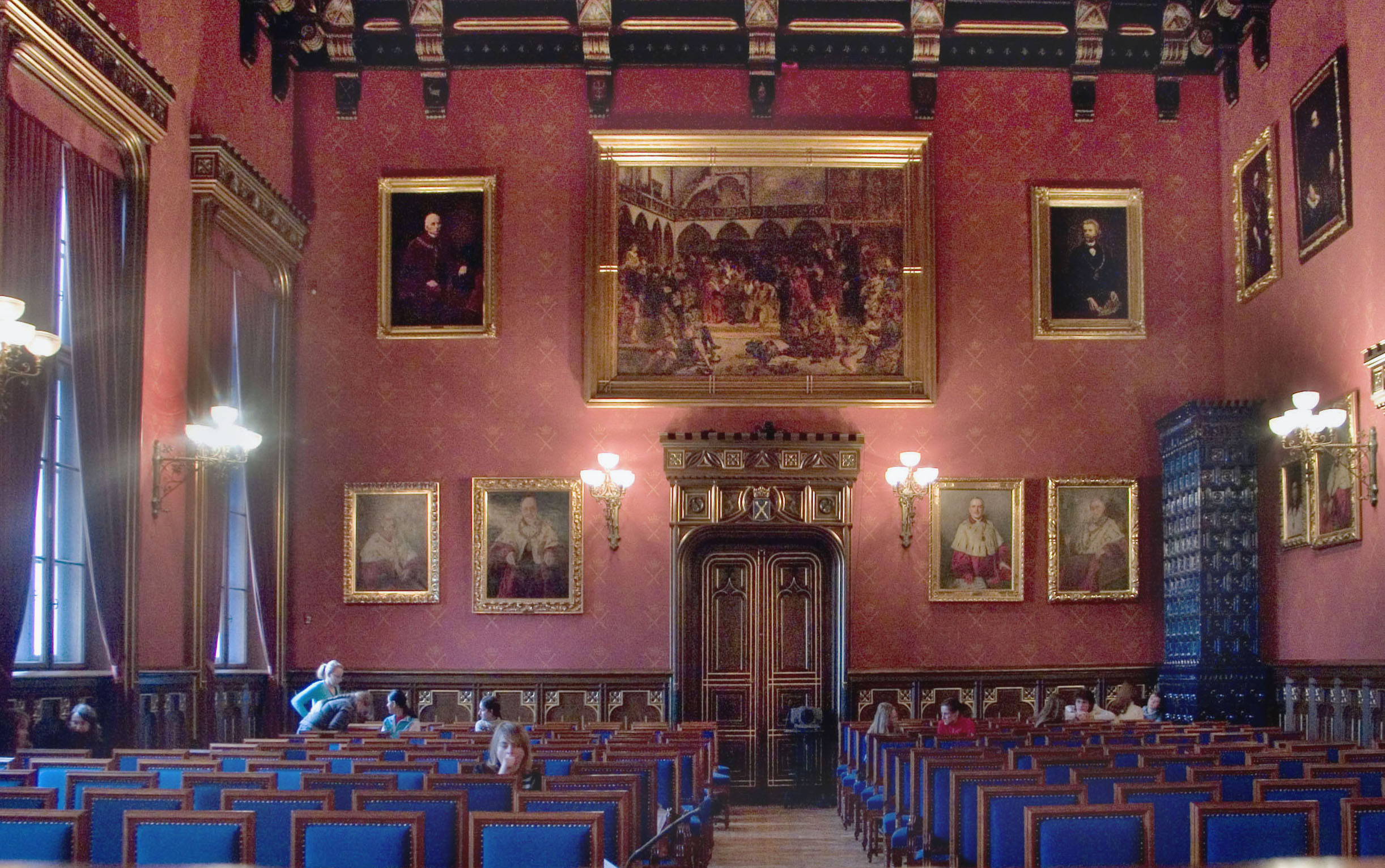
Collegium Novum assembly hall

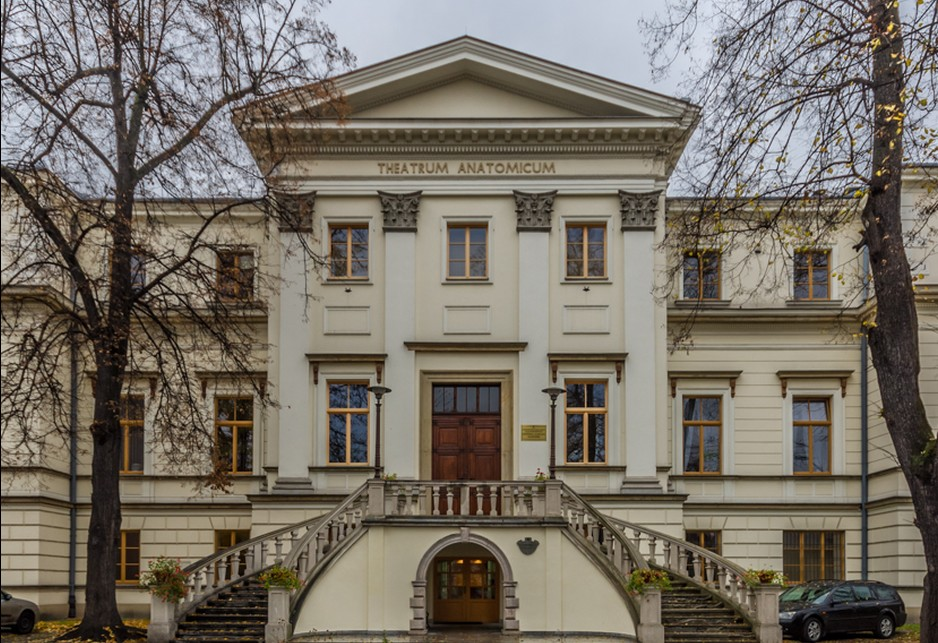
Theatrum Anatomicum

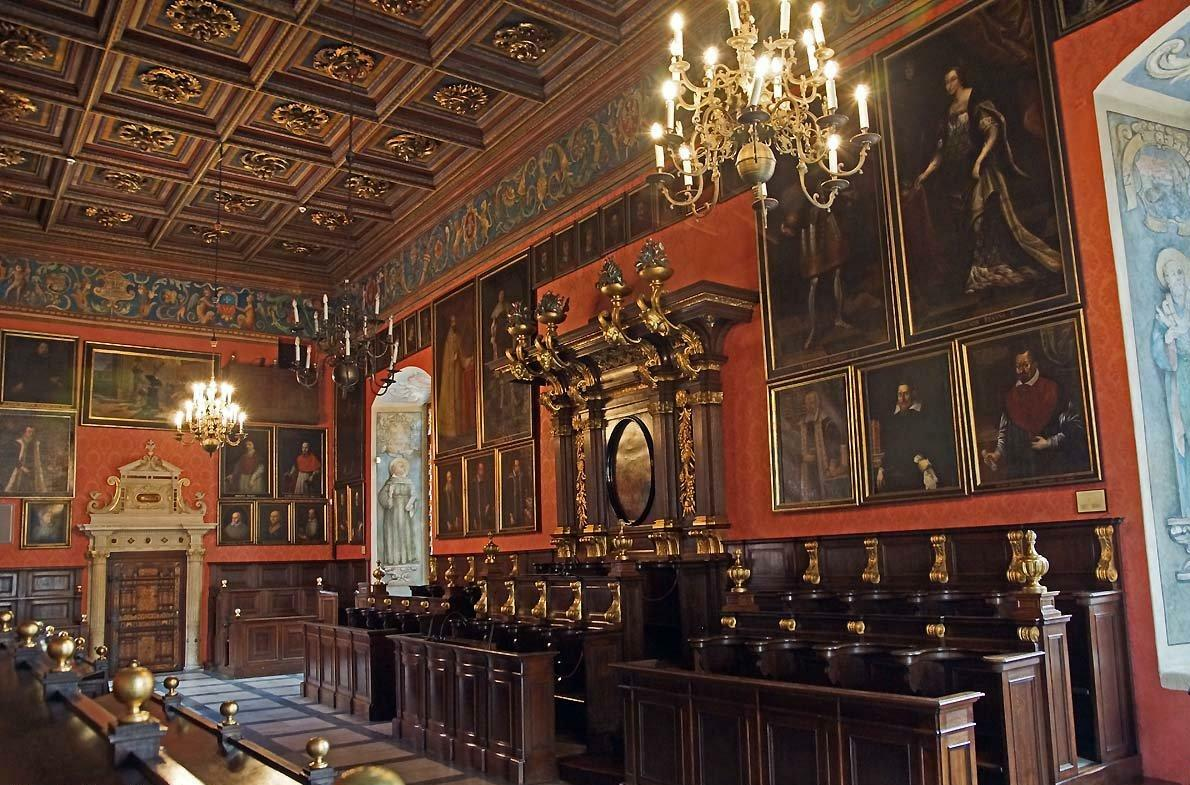
Collegium Maius

One of the greatest personalities of the 16th century was undoubtedly Maciej of Miechów (1457–1523), a historian and physician; he served as Rector of the University for eight terms and is often called the "Polish Hippocrates". Other eminent scholars include Wojciech Oczko (1537–1599), author of many meticulous works on balneology and syphilology; Sebastian Petrycy of Pilzno (1554–1626), a clinician, philanthropist, and renowned expert on Aristotle; and Josephus Struthius (1510–1568), a critic of Galen and author of Sphygmicae artis libri quinque (1555), a treatise on the human pulse, he went on to lecture in Padua.

The 17th and 18th centuries saw a decline in the university, marked mainly by external factors (e.g., the 1655–1660 Swedish invasions), which led to a decrease in the number of students. Those students who decided to stay in Kraków, especially medical students, oftentimes received an incomplete education and had to supplement their studies abroad, mainly in Italy, where they obtained doctoral degrees.

The second half of the 18th century saw the condition of the university improve dramatically when, in 1773, the Commission of National Education entrusted Hugo Kołłątaj with the task of reform, carried out from 1778 to 1780. This reform initiated a new period in the history of the Faculty of Medicine: Professor Andrzej Badurski (1740–1789) worked to establish a clinic, ultimately opened in 1780, and Rafał Józef Czerwiakowski (1743–1816) began to teach surgery and, as professor of anatomy, was one of the first to perform posthumous examinations in Poland. When Kraków was partitioned as part of the Austrian Empire in 1796, attempts were made at transforming the university into an Austrian institution through the introduction of foreign teachers. Not until 1809, when Kraków was partitioned as part of the Duchy of Warsaw, did the university regain its Polish identity.

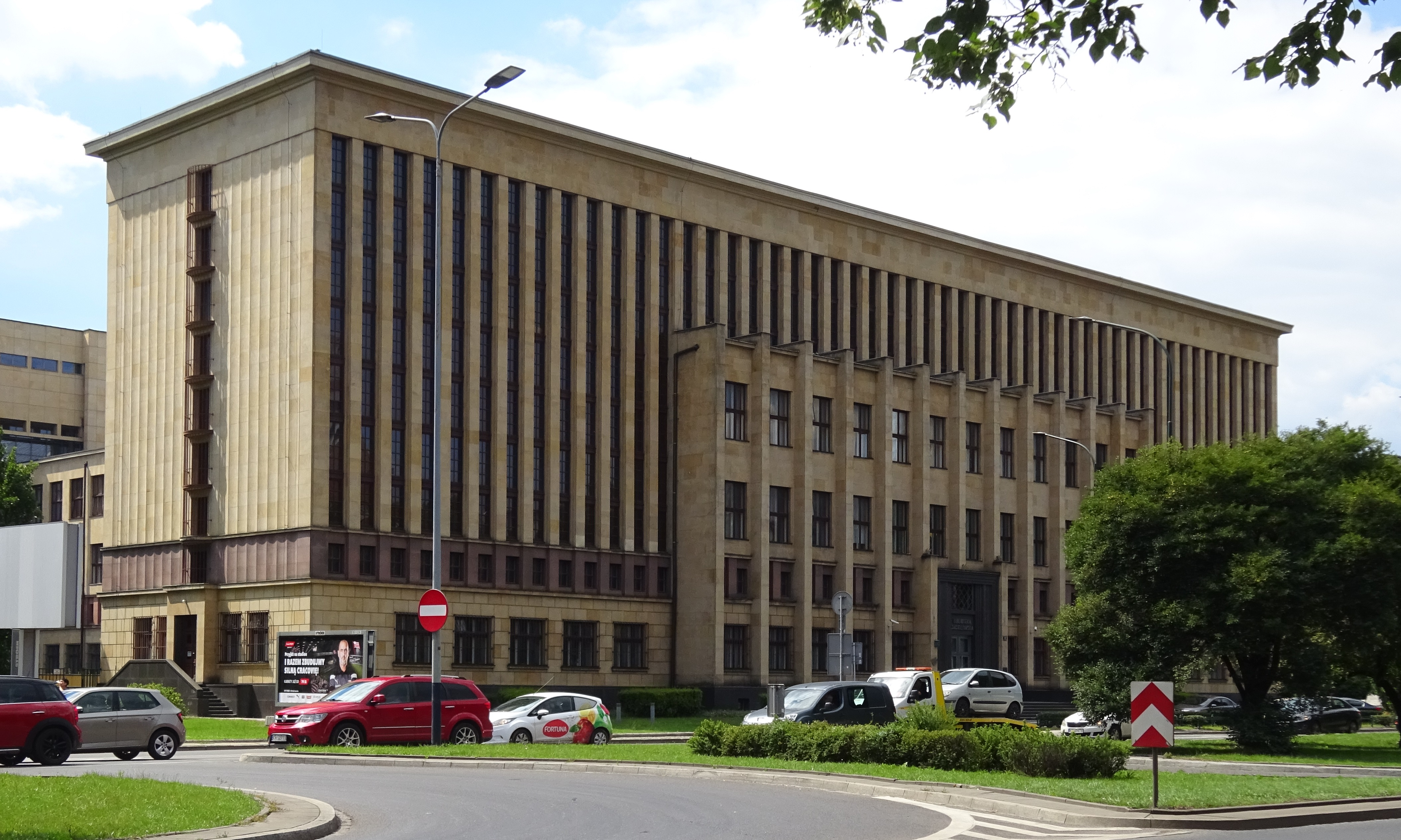
Jagiellonian Library

The university entered into a period of prosperity when Kraków gained political independence in 1815–1846. The university owes its renown to such academics as Józef Brodowicz (1790–1885), professor of internal diseases; Ludwik Bierkowski (1801–1860), professor of surgery; and Józef Majer (1808–1899) and Fryderyk Skobel (1806–1878), professors of theoretical sciences. The 19th century saw a period of further prosperity at the Faculty of Medicine and university, owing to such outstanding scholars and physicians as Józef Dietl (1804–1878); Edward Korczyński (1844–1905); Walery Jaworski (1849–1924), in internal diseases; Jan Mikulicz Radecki (1850–1905); and Ludwik Rydygier (1850–1920) and Alfred Obaliński (1843–1898), in surgery.

The beginnings of stomatology date back to the 18th century. Already in 1779, Professor Rafał Czerwiakowski included dentistry as part of his university lectures for barbers-surgeons. From 1899, the completion of medical studies also required participation in dentistry lectures. Similar to ophthalmology, orthopedics, or laryngology, dentistry was at first considered a part of surgery, long remaining within this field. Formed at Jagiellonian University in 1902, Poland's first Chair of Dentistry continued the process of establishing dentistry as an independent discipline. This Chair was headed by Professor Wincenty Łepkowski (1866–1935). During World War II, medical studies were secretly organized and run by Professor Stanisław Madziarski. In 1950, all Faculties of Medicine in Poland were separated from their universities and transformed into independent institutions, called "academies of medicine".

Notable events during the functioning of the Nicolaus Copernicus Academy of Medicine (i.e., present-day Jagiellonian University Medical College) included the formation of new clinics (e.g., 3rd Clinic of Internal Diseases, 3rd Clinic of Surgery) as well as the Department of Dentistry at the Faculty of Medicine. Established in 1948, the Department of Dentistry grew to include four chairs in preventive dentistry, prosthodontics, dental surgery, and orthodontics. Each newly established department was located in old tenements or post-hospital buildings, as practically no new buildings were being built. Since 1950, the Faculty of Medicine at the Academy of Medicine educated a great number of students, filling deficits in the post-war health service and improving the health of the general population. All of its Chairs and Clinics made great strides in teaching and research, oftentimes gaining worldwide recognition. In 1965, the Institute of Pediatrics, a technological and architectural wonder at the time, was built in Prokocim District. This facility was built thanks to support from the Polish-American community and American government. Located far outside of the old town, it was built in an area which was to also include a future campus and medical center. In the 1970s and 1980s, three student dormitories and a modern medical library were built in its immediate vicinity.

In September 2000, an Institute of Stomatology was formed. Located on ul. Montelupich (Montelupich Street), it is equipped to 21st century standards and is the site of research and educational activities.

A Conference Center was put into use in 2006. This facility is meant to accommodate student needs and also serves as a venue for conferences and conventions.

=== School of Medicine in English ===
The School of Medicine in English is a structural unit of the Faculty of Medicine. Its first students were admitted in October 1994. During the 2008/2009 academic year, over 480 students from five continents and twenty countries were enrolled in the School, with the majority coming from Norway, the US, and Canada.

The School offers two programs of medicine, taught exclusively in English. This first is a 4-year program for graduates of pre-medical college/university programs in the USA/Canada and the second is a 6-year program for graduates of secondary schools. Graduates of these programs are conferred a Doctor of Medicine (MD) degree by the Jagiellonian University Faculty of Medicine. Academic staff include the most experienced scholars and lecturers at Jagiellonian University, as well as foreign academics from the US, England, Germany, and other countries. These English-language programs remain in compliance with Polish and EU standards of teaching, the US Department of Education (Stafford Loan Program), and Medical Board of California.

Under agreements with different universities, final year students of the School of Medicine in English have the opportunity to complete elective rotations at the following schools:

- University of Rochester School of Medicine and Dentistry, Rochester, NY
- Perelman School of Medicine at the University of Pennsylvania, Philadelphia, PA
- University of California, Los Angeles (UCLA) David Geffen School of Medicine, Los Angeles, CA
- University of California, Irvine (UCI), Irvine, CA
- University of California, San Diego (UCSD), San Diego, CA
- Loma Linda University Medical Center (LLU), Loma Linda, CA
- Case Western Reserve University (CWRU), Cleveland, OH

Graduates of both programs are eligible to apply for residency and postgraduate training programs at university teaching hospitals in various countries, including the United States (Illinois, Alabama, Arizona, Michigan, Utah, Vermont, New York, Georgia, New Jersey, Florida, Pennsylvania, Connecticut, West Virginia, Ohio, Louisiana, South Carolina and Washington DC), Canada (Quebec, Ontario, Saskatchewan, British Columbia, Alberta), Australia, United Kingdom, Ireland, Norway, Sweden, and Poland.

== Faculty of Pharmacy ==
The first chairs of pharmacy in Poland were formed as a direct result of the disbanding of the Jesuit order in 1773. At the time, this order had complete control over the entire Polish education system. The fact that the Commission of National Education was able to take over Jesuit possessions made education reform all the more possible. The end result was a three-stage secular educational system with elementary schools at the base and two universities (or Main Schools, as they were called) – the Crown School of Kraków and the Lithuanian School of Vilnius.

Andrzej Badurski was the major initiator of reform in the teaching of pharmacy. Andrzej Szaser also helped in implementing these reforms. In 1783, the chair of pharmacy and medical matter was established at the Crown School of Kraków. Its first professor was Jan Szaster (1746–1793), a Kraków pharmacist and Doctor of Medicine.

In 1804, pharmacy training was shortened to one year in all schools of the Austrian monarchy, including the Crown School of Kraków. After the Republic of Kraków was established in 1815, a two-year pharmacy course was introduced into the Kraków School.

From 1809, the education of pharmacists took place at two faculties, namely at the Faculty of Medicine, and Philosophy. In 1809, Józef Sawiczewski was appointed head of the chair of pharmacy and Medical Matter. After his death in 1825, this function was entrusted to Florian Sawiczewski, the most outstanding pharmacy professor of the time. In 1851, he was named rector of Jagiellonian University.

In 1833, the chair of pharmacy was integrated with the chair of general and applied chemistry, later a part of the Faculty of Philosophy, which substantially changed how the teaching of pharmacy was organized. In the period from 1857 to 1920, pharmacy students had their classes conducted by such renowned professors as Edward Janczewski, Józef Łazarski, Emil Czyrniański, Karol Olszewski, Zygmunt Wróblewski, Marian Smoluchowski, Rafał Czerwiakowski, Józef Rostafiński, and Władysław Szajnocha.

Amidst nationwide discussion, the teaching of pharmacy was completely reformed after Poland regained independence in 1918. Pharmaceutical departments were transformed into independent faculties of pharmacy with four-year teaching periods. The first head of the Department of Pharmacy at Jagiellonian University was Professor Karol Dziewoński, followed by Professor Tadeusz Estreicher, who took up the post in 1926.

On the eve of World War II, the Kraków Department of Pharmacy had five separate units: Applied Pharmacy, Pharmaceutical Botany, Pharmaceutical Chemistry, Zoology for Pharmacy, and the Garden of Medical Plants, a part of the Jagiellonian University Botanical Garden.

In 1947, the Department of Pharmacy, operating within the Faculty of Philosophy, was transformed into a separate Faculty of Pharmacy. Professor Marek Gatty-Kostyal was appointed as its first dean.

The Kraków Faculty of Pharmacy entered a new era on January 1, 1950, when, along with the Faculty of Medicine, it was separated from Jagiellonian University and transformed into the Academy of Medicine.

Another milestone in the history of the Kraków Faculty of Pharmacy was the formation of the Department of Medical Analytic. This Department, with a separate 5-year teaching program, began to function during the 1977/1978 academic year.

The year in which the Faculties of Pharmacy and Medicine were rejoined with Jagiellonian University was of special importance to the Faculty of Pharmacy. Among others, it was the first time the newly built seat of the Department of Pharmacy on ul. Medyczna (Medyczna Street) was put to use. A modern didactic base and expanding set of research equipment allowed to extend its range of international academic and didactic cooperation as well as actively participate in the activities of the European Association of Faculties of Pharmacy (EAFP), of which the Faculty is a member since 2000. One of the consequences of this change was a considerable increase in the number of elective courses offered.

International programs carried out at the Faculty also allow for a constant perfecting of the process of education. In 2006, by decision of the Minister of Science and Higher Education, the Faculty of Pharmacy was classified as a category - A institution.

== Faculty of Health Sciences ==
Based on the decision of the Jagiellonian University Senate of 26 February 1997, with effect from 1 October 1997 Department of Nursing became the Department of Health. With effect from 1 October 2007 renamed the Department of the Faculty of Health Sciences.

Faculty of Health Sciences was launched in 1911 in Kraków at the School of Nursing, which was transformed in 1925 in the University School of Nurses and Hygienists. Its operation was interrupted by World War II, after which, the School has resumed operations, educating nurses at the level of secondary vocational education. Teaching at the Master's level nurses started in Kraków in 1975 creating a Department of Nursing, Medical University, who as part of the College of Medicine, he returned to Alma Mater in 1993 Jagellonica Institute of Nursing after the creation of the department continued to teach master's level nurses, and in 1998 began - first in Poland - conducting classes in the two-cycle. Department also continues the tradition of training for midwives, which was launched in Kraków in 1780 in College Physics, Faculty of Medicine, Jagiellonian University School of the Crown. In 1895, midwifery education has been excluded from school and taken over by Imperial Royal College of Midwives, and after independence, the National School of Midwives. In 2005, the Faculty of Health Sciences was held on the first call for obstetric studies degree. In the same year it was renamed the Institute of Nursing and Midwifery.

The department's activities draw on more than a century of academic tradition, incorporating the modern interdisciplinary field of public health. The division continues the mission of the School of Public Health, which was established in 1991 as an interdepartmental unit spanning both the Medical Academy and Jagiellonian University. The first Polish School of Public Health was established with the support of the Ministry of Health and Welfare and with the advice of representatives of the French Ministry of Health. School team in 1991 began an intensive education and a variety of activities aimed at preparing managers for the modern needs of a changing Polish health care system. In 1997, the school became the Institute of Public Health. In subsequent years, the Institute conducted a variety of post-graduate diplomas in hospital management, postgraduate studies for people working in managerial positions in health institutions, the pharmaceutical inspectors and studies for those carrying out tasks in the field of health programs. The Institute also conducts training at the direction of public health, specialty health control, as well as international Masters EuroPubHealth. Department of Emergency Medicine by teaching in the field of emergency medical services. Initially, paramedics training takes place under the direction of nursing specialties (the first intake in 2001). Since 2004 the above-mentioned line was pursued in the direction of public health and in 2007 was the first recruitment for medical emergency, as a distinct field of study. 15 January 2009 Department of Emergency Medicine found separated from the structure of the Institute of Public Health and transformed into an independent unit of the department.

The Faculty of Health Sciences since 1998, is also conducted training at the direction of physiotherapy. In connection with the Malopolska Region to improve the quality of education in the medical professions, in 2001 in Kraków is an agreement between the Małopolska Voivodship and the Jagiellonian University on joint action to amend the system of education in the profession of physiotherapy techniques. As a result of this agreement led to increased recruitment for the department faculty, liquidated Medical School No. 4 in Kraków, and education as a whole took the Department to adopt against the study of academic staff. Institute of Physiotherapy focusing unit underlying the teaching and scientific research for this direction was established in 2006.

The creation of the department was responding to a new socio-economic situation in Poland in connection with health care reform and the new labor market. These changes necessitated the establishment of priorities in education. A new look for the training of health workers was the result of several factors: a new management philosophy in health care, the transition from medical care to health promotion and disease prevention, a strong emphasis on primary health care and medical technology development significantly. It was necessary to meet the demand for skilled health workers who had to fill managerial positions of high and middle level, and ensure the supply of specialized medical personnel (nurses, physiotherapists, midwives, emergency workers, sanitary inspectors). This was possible due to set out by the university and the Marshal of Malopolska agreements on joint action concerning changes to education systems in some medical professions education. First, in 1999, involved the training of nurses, the next (described above), 2001 related training of physiotherapists, and the last on the training of midwives was concluded in 2005 Currently, the department launched the five fields of study: nursing, midwifery, physiotherapy, public health, medical emergency and a specialization in health control, as well as student exchanges are carried out under the Socrates-Erasmus. The structure of the Faculty of Health Sciences consists of three institutes: the Institute of Nursing and Midwifery, Institute of Public Health and the Institute of Physiotherapy.

Faculty of Health Sciences as an academic unit, focuses primarily on educating students, creating the possibility of personal, professional and scientific development. Further, leads a broad scientific research activities and its staff act as consultants assisting the health care environment. The division develops activities concerning the dissemination of knowledge, including in nursing clinical internship in internal and environmental, obstetrics and gynecological diseases, epidemiology, health promotion, environmental health problems, the case of an emergency in the states of a sudden life-threatening accidents and catastrophes, health psychology and medical education. The Faculty of his scientific activity also takes an interdisciplinary approach to the subject of disease prevention, diagnosis, treatment, care and rehabilitation. Employees specialize in research on issues of organization and economics of health, economy, pharmaceuticals and medical materials, computerization and dissemination of information problems in health care. The Faculty conducted advanced research in the field of medical biology, including immunology, cell biology, reproductive endocrinology, physiology and pathophysiology of the digestive system, ergonomics and exercise.

Further, by scientific and educational cooperation with foreign centers (including universities), including Maastricht (Netherlands), Sheffield (England), Rennes and Lailly-en-Val (France), Granada (Spain), Copenhagen (Denmark), Plzeň (Czech Republic), Kaunas (Lithuania) and Kristianstad (Sweden).

== University hospitals and clinics ==
- University Hospital
- University Children's Hospital
- University Hospital of Orthopedics and Rehabilitation in Zakopane
- University Dental Clinic

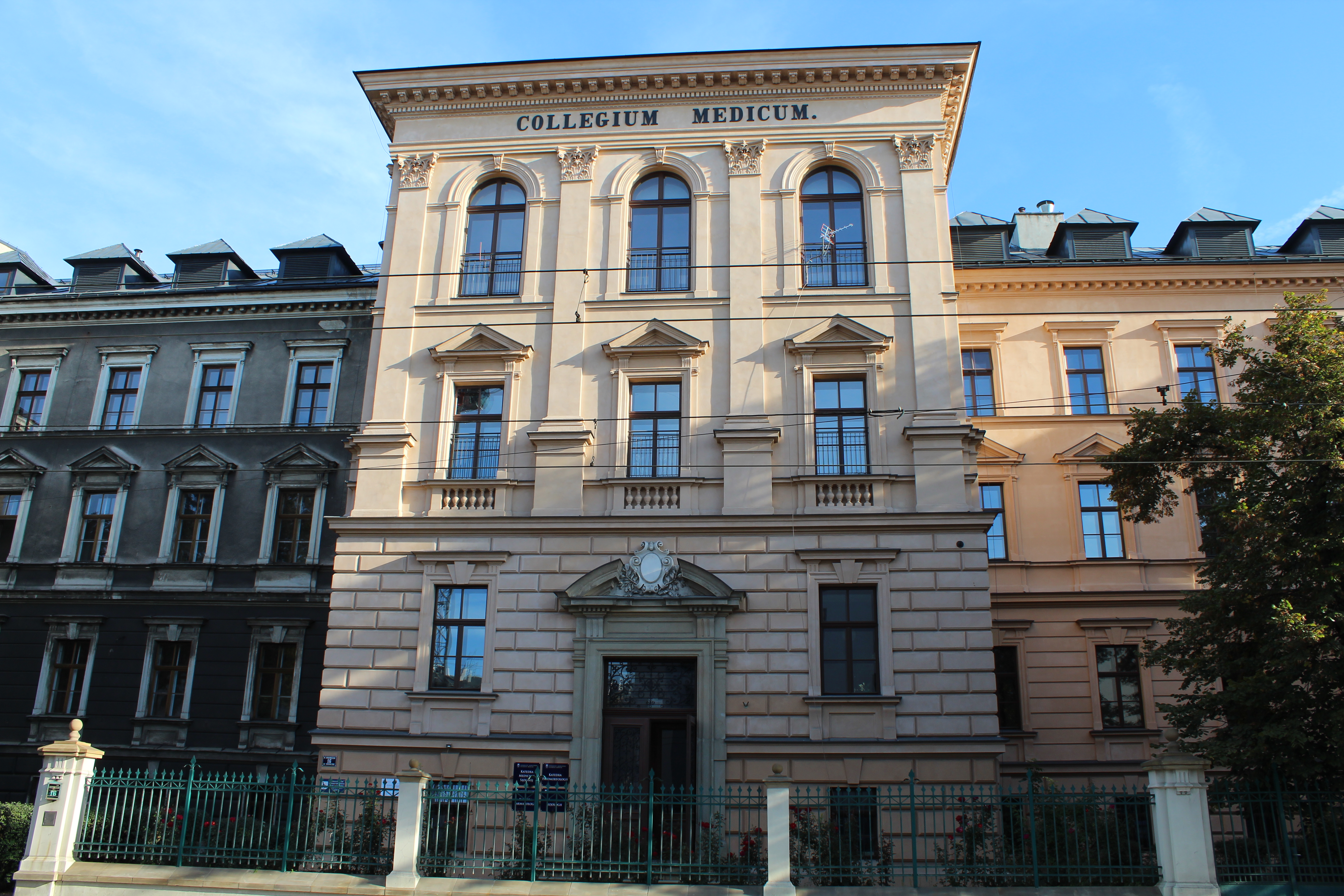
Collegium Medicum

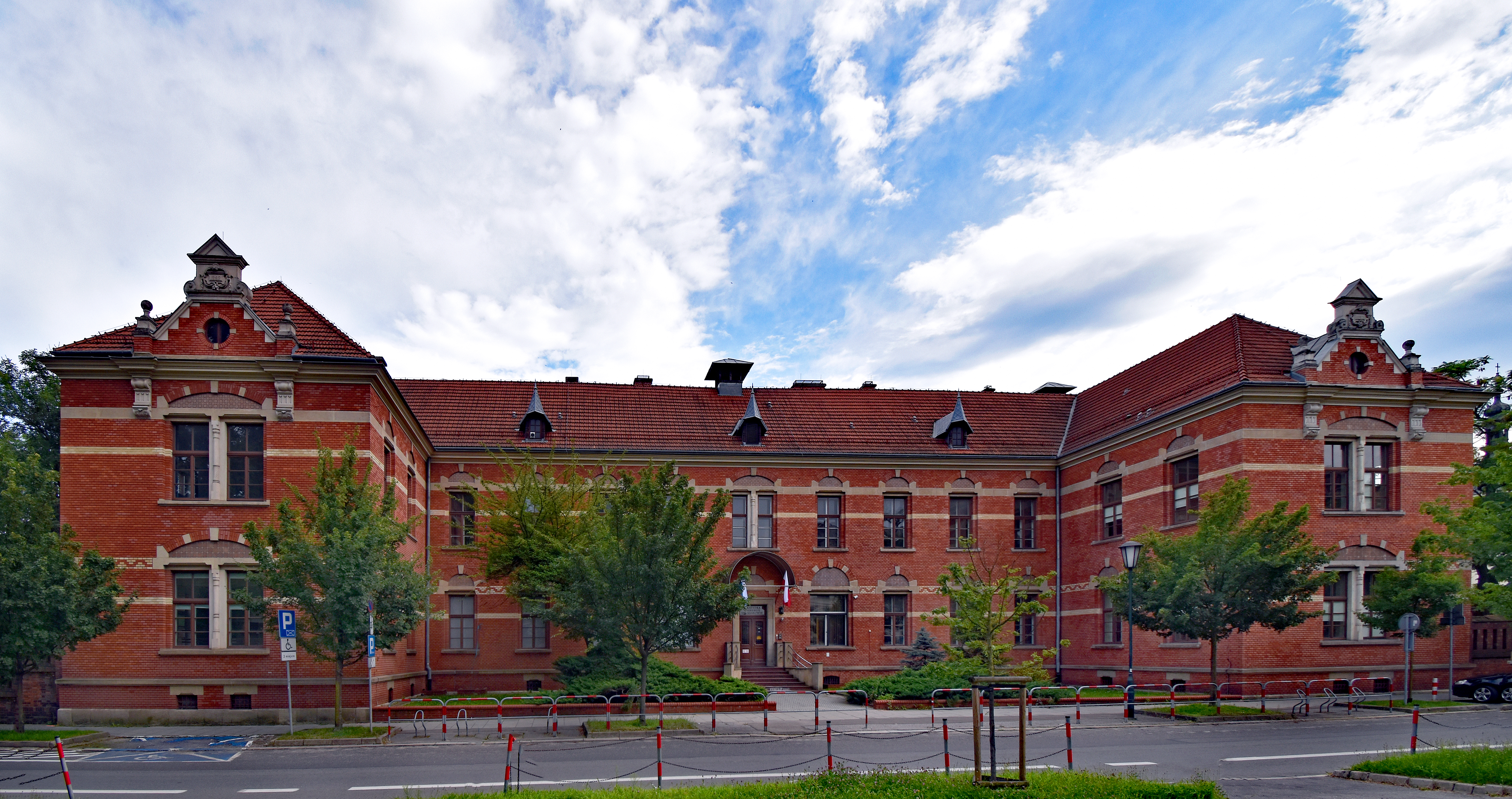
Red Surgery

== Student life ==
Students can compete to win the University Vice-Rector Cup in skiing or take part in a similarly challenging swimming competition. Each academic year begins with a memorable ceremony of the Inauguration Walk, a tradition in which professors, lecturers and students trek from one university building to another. May 12 is the University Day, which commemorates the institution's establishment in 1364. Each year, university students celebrate this (or, more appropriately, their) day called "Juvenalia," as they are given a symbolic key to the gates of the city. This signals the beginning of several days of festivities, sometimes lasting into the early hours of the morning.

The student organisations active at the institution include:

- JUMC Student Government, 4-Year Medical Program
- Student Council Jagiellonian University
- Student Scientific Society of the Jagiellonian University
- International Medical Students' Association - IFMSA
- Academic Sports Association of the Jagiellonian University CM

== See also ==
- Rectors of the Jagiellonian University
- List of Jagiellonian University people
- List of universities in Poland
