= Rectors of the Jagiellonian University =

Rectors of the Jagiellonian University – List of rectors of the Jagiellonian University, known also as the Cracow Academy, University of Cracow, and Szkoła Główna Koronna. The list begins in 1400 at the restoration of the university under Jadwiga of Poland and Władysław II Jagiełło.

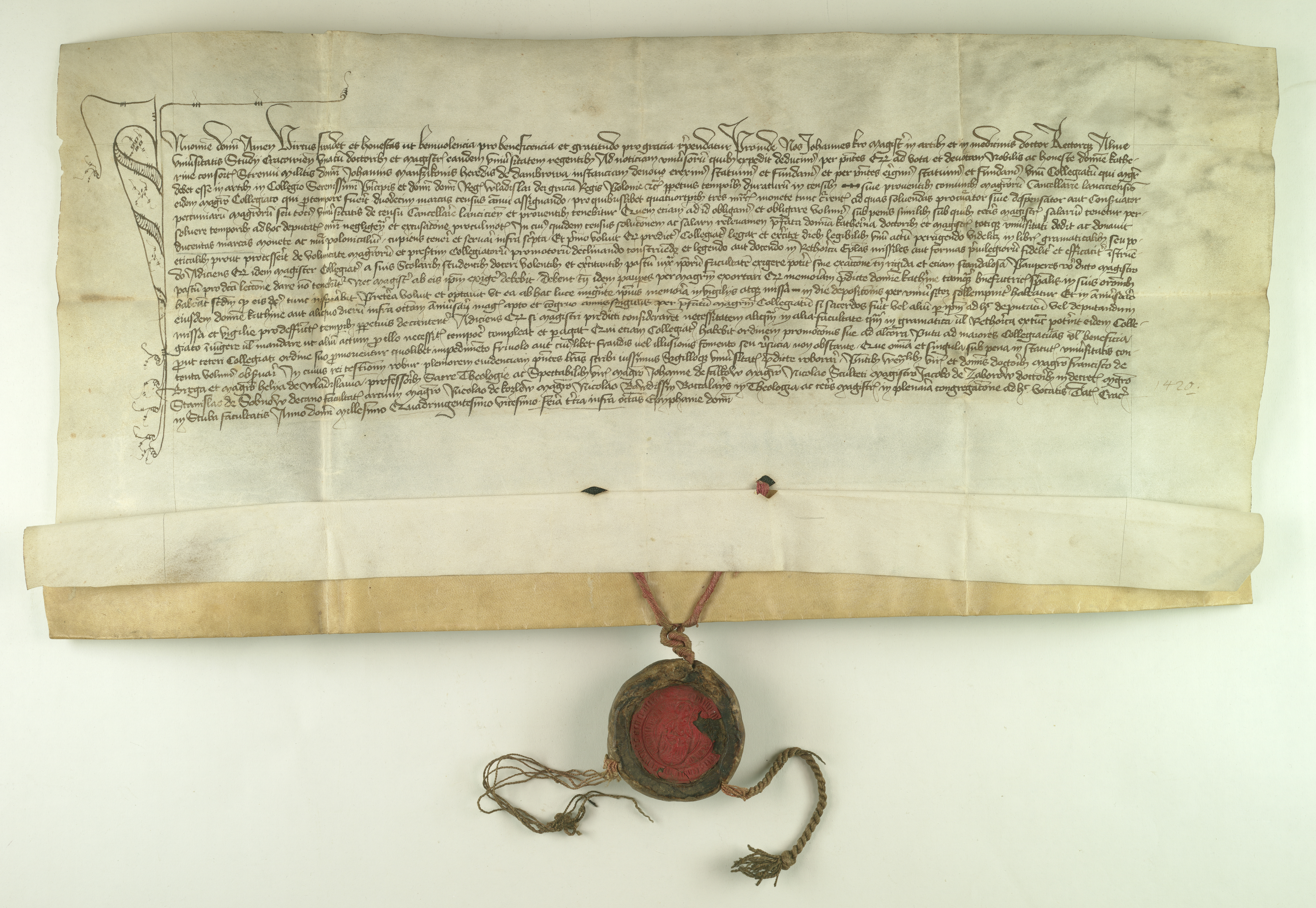
Document authorized by Jan Kro, rector in 1420.

== Uniwersytet Krakowski / Akademia Krakowska ==
=== 1400–1499 ===
- 1400–1401 – Stanisław of Skarbimierz
- 1401–1402 – Jonas Vaidutis
- 1402–1403 – Mikołaj Gorzkowski z Gorzkowa
- 1403–1404 – Otton of Mstyczowa
- 1404–1405 – Jan Szafraniec (bishop)
- 1405–1406 – Jan Rzeszowski
- 1406–1407 – Mikołaj z Pyzdr
- 1407–1408 – Franciszek Kreysewicz z Brzegu
- 1408–1409 – Andrzej z Kokorzyna
- 1409–1410 – Eliasz z Wąwolnicy
- 1410–1411 – Mikołaj z Kozłowa
- 1411–1412 – Łukasz z Wielkiego Koźmina
- 1412–1413 – Mikołaj Hinczowic z Kazimierza
- 1413–1414 – Stanisław of Skarbimierz
- 1414–1415 – Paweł Włodkowic z Brudzenia
- 1416–1417 – Mikołaj Baudissin z Krakowa
- 1417-1418 – Mikołaj z Konradswalde
- 1418 – Jan Falkowski z Falkowa
- 1419 – Paweł Włodkowic z Brudzenia
- 1419 – Pełka z Borzykowej
- 1419–1420 – Jan Kro z Chociebuża
- 1420 – Jakub z Nowego Sącza
- 1420–1421 – Jakub z Zaborowa
- 1421 – Mikołaj Goldberg z Nysy
- 1421–1422 – Tomasz z Chrobrza
- 1422 – Aleksander Mazowiecki, prince of Masovia
- 1423 – Jakub Peyser z Pyzdr
- 1423–1424 – Maciej z Koła
- 1424 – Jan z Radochoniec
- 1424–1425 – Jakub z Zaborowa
- 1425 – Jan of Pavia (Johannes de Saccis)
- 1426 – Andrzej z Kokorzyna
- 1426–1427 – Władysław Oporowski
- 1427 – Jan Elgot
- 1427–1428 – Benedykt Hesse z Krakowa
- 1428–1429 – Wawrzyniec z Raciborza
- 1429 – Andrzej z Kokorzyna
- 1429–1430 – Franciszek Kreysewicz z Brzegu
- 1430 – Jan z Wielunia
- 1430–1431 – Andrzej z Buku
- 1431 – Jan z Radochoniec
- 1431–1432 – Dersław z Borzynowa
- 1432–1433 – Tomasz ze Strzempina
- 1433 – Mikołaj Tempelfeld z Brzegu
- 1433–1434 – Tomasz z Bodzentyna
- 1434 – Stanisław z Uścia z Uścia
- 1434–1435 – Jan Puszka z Krakowa
- 1435 – Michał z Szydłowa
- 1435–1436 – Andrzej z Buku
- 1436–1437 – Jan z Jastrzębia
- 1437 – Jakub z Zaborowa
- 1437–1438 – Jan Elgot
- 1438 – Dersław z Borzynowa
- 1438–1439 – Mikołaj z Krakowa (rector)
- 1439–1440 – Jakub Parkosz z Żórawic
- 1440 – Jan z Dobry
- 1440–1441 – Jakub Parkosz z Żurawic
- 1441–1442 – Paweł z Piotrkowa
- 1442–1443 – Stanisław Cielątko z Lisina
- 1443–1444 – Tomasz ze Strzempina
- 1444 – Jakub z Zaborowa
- 1444–1445 – Bartłomiej z Radomia
- 1445–1446 – Stanisław Cielątko z Lisina
- 1446 – Stanisław z Sobniowa
- 1446–1447 – Jan z Dąbrówki
- 1447 – Jakub z Zaborowa
- 1447–1448 – Jakub ze Stradomia
- 1448–1449 – Mikołaj Bylina z Leszczyn
- 1449 – Maciej z Łabiszyna
- 1449–1450 – Benedykt Hesse z Krakowa
- 1450–1451 – Andrzej z Sadowia
- 1451 – Benedykt Hesse z Krakowa
- 1451–1452 – Jan z Dąbrówki
- 1452 – Jan z Pniew
- 1452–1453 – Jan ze Słupcy
- 1453 – Mikołaj z Kalisza
- 1453–1454 – Jan z Dąbrówki
- 1454 – Benedykt Hesse z Krakowa
- 1454–1455 – Mikołaj Bylina z Leszczyn
- 1455–1456 – Benedykt Hesse z Krakowa
- 1456–1457 – Jan z Pniew
- 1457–1458 – Kasper Rokenberg z Krakowa
- 1458–1459 – Jan z Dąbrówki
- 1459–1460 – Kasper Rokenberg z Krakowa
- 1460 – Wojciech z Liśca
- 1460–1461 – Sędziwój Tęczyński z Tęczyna
- 1461–1462 – Mikołaj Bylina z Leszczyn
- 1462–1463 – Arnolf z Mirzyńca
- 1463 – Paweł z Kłobucka
- 1463–1464 – Mikołaj z Kalisza
- 1464–1465 – Petrus Gaszowiec z Loćmierzy
- 1465–1466 – Andrzej Grzymała z Poznania
- 1466–1467 – Paweł z Kłobucka
- 1467–1468 – Jan z Dąbrówki
- 1468–1469 – Jan z Latoszyna
- 1469 – Stanisław z Szadka
- 1469–1470 – Mikołaj Bylina z Leszczyn
- 1470 – Petrus Gaszowiec Loćmierzy
- 1470–1471 – Arnolf z Mirzyńca
- 1471–1472 – Jan z Dąbrówki
- 1472 – Klemens z Górki
- 1472–1473 – Maciej z Kościana
- 1473–1474 – Maciej z Błędowa
- 1474 – Jakub z Szadka
- 1474–1475 – Maciej z Błędowa
- 1475–1476 – Jakub z Szadka
- 1476–1477 – Jan ze Słupcy
- 1477–1478 – Maciej z Kobylina
- 1478–1479 – Stanisław z Zawady
- 1479 – Jerzy Proger z Krakowa
- 1479–1480 – Jan (Beber) z Oświęcimia
- 1480–1481 – Arnolf z Mirzyńca
- 1481 – Klemens z Górki
- 1481–1482 – Stanisław z Brzezin
- 1482–1483 – Maciej z Kościana
- 1483–1484 – Jan z Latoszyna
- 1484–1485 – Maciej z Kobylina
- 1485 – Maciej z Kościana
- 1485–1487 – Jan z Baruchowa
- 1487–1488 – Mikołaj z Krakowa
- 1488–1489– Maciej z Kobylina
- 1489 – Stanisław z Kobylina
- 1489 – Maciej z Kobylina
- 1489–1490 – Bernard Mikisch z Nysy
- 1490 – Stanisław z Brzezin
- 1490 – Maciej z Kobylina
- 1490–1491 – Jan z Pilczy
- 1491–1492 – Maciej z Kobylina
- 1492–1493 – Jan z Latoszyna
- 1493 – Jan ze Staniszewic
- 1493–1495 – Jan (Sacranus) z Oświęcimia
- 1495 – Maciej z Szydłowa
- 1495–1496 – Walenty z Olkusza
- 1496–1497 – Andrzej z Łabiszyna
- 1497–1498 – Jan z Wysoki
- 1498–1499 – Jan V Thurzo of Cracow
- 1499 – Jan ze Starzechowic

=== 1500–1599 ===
- 1499–1500 – Walenty z Olkusza
- 1500 – Jan z Reguł
- 1500–1501 – Wojciech z Pniew
- 1501 – Mikołaj z Pilczy
- 1501–1502 – Maciej Miechowita
- 1502 – Jan z Reguł
- 1502–1503 – Marcin Łysy z Krakowa
- 1503–1504 – Jakub z Gostynina
- 1504–1505 – Jan Amicinus z Krakowa
- 1505–1506 – Maciej Miechowita
- 1506–1507 – Bernard z Biskupiego (sometimes, z Krakowa)
- 1507 – Jan z Reguł
- 1507–1508 – Maciej Miechowita
- 1508 - Jan z Reguł
- 1508–1509 – Stanisław Skawinka z Krakowa
- 1509–1510 – Stanisław Biel (rector) z Nowego Miasta
- 1510–1511 – Adam of Łowicz
- 1511–1512 – Maciej Miechowita
- 1512–1513 – Jan (Sacranus) z Oświęcimia
- 1513–1514 – Michał Twaróg of Bystrzyków
- 1514–1515 – Andrzej Gorra z Mikołajewic
- 1515–1516 – Jakub z Ercieszowa
- 1516–1517 – Jan Amicinus z Krakowa
- 1517–1518 – Stanisław Biel z Nowego Miasta
- 1518–1519 – Maciej Miechowita
- 1519–1521 – Jakub z Ercieszowa
- 1521 – Jan (Sacranus) z Oświęcimia
- 1521–1522 – Stanisław Biel z Nowego Miasta
- 1522–1524 – Marcin Biem z Olkusza
- 1524–1525 – Jakub z Ercieszowa
- 1525–1526 – Piotr Wedeliciusz z Obornik
- 1526 – Jan Amicinus z Krakowa
- 1526–1527 – Łukasz Noskowski z Noskowa
- 1527 – Marcin Biem z Olkusza
- 1527–1529 – Bernard z Biskupiego
- 1529–1530 – Mikołaj z Koprzywnicy
- 1530–1531 – Marcin Biem z Olkusza
- 1531–1532 – Stanisław Biel (rector) z Nowego Miasta
- 1532–1533 – Jakub z Ercieszowa
- 1533 – Stanisław Biel (rector) z Nowego Miasta
- 1533–1534 – Mikołaj Mleczko z Wieliczki
- 1534–1536 – Marcin Biem z Olkusza
- 1536–1537 – Marcin Bełza z Krakowa
- 1537–1538 – Grzegorz Snopek z Szamotuł
- 1538–1540 – Grzegorz ze Stawiszyna
- 1540–1541 – Jan Grodek of Sanok
- 1541–1542 – Erazm Wonsam (Volsam) z Krakowa
- 1542–1543 – Mikołaj Mleczko z Wieliczki
- 1543–1545 – Jan Prosiński z Piotrkowa
- 1545–1546 – Jan Grodek of Sanok
- 1546–1548 – Zygmunt ze Stężycy
- 1548–1549 – Mikołaj z Szadka Prokopowicz
- 1549–1551 – Jakub Friedel z Kleparza
- 1551–1552 – Jan Grodek of Sanok
- 1552–1554 – Antoni z Napąchania
- 1554–1555 – Zygmunt ze Stężycy
- 1555–1557 – Maciej Łącki
- 1557–1558 – Mikołaj z Szadka Prokopowicz
- 1558–1560 – Marcin Krokier z Krakowa
- 1560–1561 – Mikołaj z Szadka Prokopowicz
- 1561–1562 – Jan z Turobina
- 1562–1563 – Marcin Krokier z Krakowa
- 1563–1564 – Sebastian Janeczka z Kleparza
- 1564–1565 – Zygmunt ze Stężycy
- 1565–1566 – Jan Dobrosielski
- 1566–1567 – Marcin Krokier z Krakowa
- 1567–1568 – Zygmunt ze Stężycy
- 1568 – Marcin Krokier z Krakowa
- 1568–1570 – Jan z Turobina
- 1570–1571 – Stanisław Stalek z Pińczowa
- 1571–1573 – Mikołaj z Bodzęcina
- 1573–1574 – Marcin Glicjusz z Pilzna
- 1574–1575 – Jakub Górski
- 1575 – Jan z Turobina
- 1575–1576 – Jakub Górski
- 1576–1577 – Stanisław Stalek z Pińczowa
- 1577–1578 – Marcin Glicjusz z Pilzna
- 1578–1579 – Jakub Górski
- 1579–1581 – Marcin Glicjusz z Pilzna
- 1581 – Stanisław Zawadzki (Picus)
- 1581–1583 – Jakub Górski
- 1583 – Jan z Wieliczki
- 1583–1585 – Marcin Glicjusz z Pilzna
- 1585–1586 – Marcin Fox z Krakowa
- 1586–1587 – Piotr z Gorczyna
- 1587–1588 – Marcin Glicjusz z Pilzna
- 1588 – Stanisław Zawadzki (Picus)
- 1588–1589 – Marcin Glicjusz z Pilzna
- 1589 – Piotr z Gorczyna
- 1589–1591 – Mikołaj Dobrocieski
- 1591 – Marcin Glicjusz z Pilzna
- 1591–1592 – Stanisław Stalek z Pińczowa
- 1592–1593 – Jan Muscenius (Mucha) z Kurzelowa
- 1593 – Stanisław Stalek z Pińczowa
- 1593–1594 – Piotr z Gorczyna
- 1594–1595 – Jan Muscenius (Mucha) z Kurzelowa
- 1595–1596 – Walenty z Widawy
- 1596–1597 – Piotr z Gorczyna
- 1597–1599 – Walenty Fontanus
- 1599 – Piotr z Gorczyna
- 1599–1600 – Jan Muscenius (Mucha) z Kurzelowa

=== 1600–1699 ===
- 1600 – Mikołaj Dobrocieski
- 1600–1601 – Walenty z Widawy
- 1601–1602 – Jan Muscenius (Mucha) z Kurzelowa
- 1602 – Mikołaj Dobrocieski
- 1602–1603 – Walenty Fontanus
- 1603–1604 – Mikołaj Dobrocieski
- 1604–1605 – Piotr z Gorczyna
- 1605–1607 – Andrzej Schoneus z Głogowa
- 1607–1608 – Sebastian Krupka z Wieliczki
- 1608 – Andrzej Schoneus z Głogowa
- 1608–1610 – Adam Falęcki
- 1610 – Piotr z Gorczyna
- 1610–1611 – Adam Falęcki
- 1611–1613 – Andrzej Schoneus z Głogowa
- 1613 – Piotr z Gorczyna
- 1613–1614 – Andrzej Schoneus z Głogowa
- 1614 – Sebastian Krupka z Wieliczki
- 1614–1615 – Jakub Janidło z Bodzentyna
- 1615–1616 – Sebastian Krupka z Wieliczki
- 1616–1617 – Walenty Fontanus
- 1617–1618 – Bazyli Goliniusz (Goliński)
- 1618–1619 – Jakub Janidło z Bodzentyna
- 1619–1620 – Sebastian Krupka z Wieliczki
- 1620–1621 – Jakub z Turobina
- 1621–1622 – Jakub Najmanowicz
- 1622–1623 – Bazyli Goliniusz (Goliński)
- 1623–1624 – Jakub Najmanowicz
- 1624–1625 – Sebastian Krupka z Wieliczki
- 1625–1626 – Jakub Najmanowicz
- 1626–1627 – Daniel Sigonius z Lelowa
- 1627 – Krzysztof Najmanowicz
- 1627–1628 – Wojciech Borowski
- 1628 – Jakub Najmanowicz
- 1628–1630 – Daniel Sigonius z Lelowa
- 1630–1631 – Adam Opatowczyk (Opatovius) z Opatów
- 1631–1633 – Jakub Najmanowicz
- 1633–1634 – Krzysztof Najmanowicz
- 1634–1635 – Jakub Najmanowicz
- 1635–1637 – Adam Opatowczyk (Opatovius) z Opatowa
- 1637 – Daniel Sigonius z Lelowa
- 1637–1639 – Wojciech Borowski
- 1639–1640 – Maciej Wojeński
- 1640–1641 – Stanisław Pudłowski
- 1641 – Jakub Najmanowicz
- 1641–1642 – Adam Opatowczyk (Opatovius) z Opatowa
- 1642–1643 – Jakub Papenkowic z Uścia
- 1643–1645 – Jakub Witeliusz (Ciołek)
- 1645–1646 – Wawrzyniec Śmieszkowicz
- 1646–1648 – Jakub Witeliusz (Ciołek)
- 1648 – Paweł Herka z Kurzelowa
- 1648 – Zygmunt Gregorowicz
- 1648–1649 – Jakub Papenkowic z Uścia
- 1649–1650 – Stanisław Różycki
- 1650–1651 – Gabriel Ochocki
- 1651–1652 – Jakub Górski
- 1652 – Zygmunt Gregorowicz
- 1652 – Jan Brożek
- 1652–1653 – Wawrzyniec Alfons Karyński
- 1653–1655 – Gabriel Ochocki
- 1655 – Maciej Kraśnicki
- 1655–1657 – Adam Rosczewic
- 1657–1659 – Franciszek Roliński
- 1659–1660 – Stanisław Jurkowski
- 1660–1661 – Adam Rosczewic
- 1661–1662 – Wojciech Łańcucki
- 1662–1663 – Andrzej Kucharski
- 1663 – Adam Rosczewic
- 1663–1665 – Andrzej Kucharski
- 1665–1666 – Stanisław Jurkowski
- 1666–1667 – Franciszek Roliński
- 1667–1668 – Wojciech Łańcucki
- 1668–1670 – Szymon Stanisław Makowski
- 1670 – Andrzej Kucharski
- 1670–1671 – Wojciech Łańcucki
- 1671–1672 – Szymon Stanisław Makowski
- 1672–1674 – Wojciech Łańcucki
- 1674–1676 – Szymon Stanisław Makowski
- 1676 – Andrzej Kucharski
- 1676–1678 – Wojciech Łańcucki
- 1678–1679 – Andrzej Kucharski
- 1679 – Wojciech Dąbrowski
- 1679–1681 – Wojciech Papenkowic
- 1681 – Wojciech Dąbrowski
- 1681–1682 – Szymon Stanisław Makowski
- 1682–1683 – Wojciech Łańcucki
- 1683–1684 – Jakub Baltazarowicz
- 1684–1686 – Franciszek Przewoski
- 1686–1687 – Samuel Formankowicz
- 1687–1689 – Marcin Winkler
- 1689–1690 – Jan Michalski
- 1690–1692 – Franciszek Przewoski
- 1692–1693 – Krzysztof Sowiński
- 1693–1695 – Sebastian Piskorski
- 1695–1696 – Marcin Winkler
- 1696–1698 – Krzysztof Sowiński
- 1698–1699 – Sebastian Piskorski
- 1699–1701 – Maciej Psojecki

=== 1700–1777 ===
- 1701–1702 – Piotr Praczlewicz
- 1702–1704 – Andrzej Krupecki
- 1704–1706 – Piotr Praczlewicz
- 1706–1710 – Andrzej Krupecki
- 1710–1711 – Piotr Praczlewicz
- 1711–1713 – Andrzej Krupecki
- 1713–1714 – Marcin Węgrzynowicz
- 1714–1716 – Marcin Ośliński
- 1716 – Andrzej Krupecki
- 1716–1718 – Gabriel Profecki
- 1718–1719 – Wojciech Jodłowski
- 1719–1721 – Bazyli Płaszczewski
- 1721–1724 – Marcin Waleszyński
- 1724–1725 – Jan Antoni Luchini
- 1725–1727 – Marcin Kurowski
- 1727–1728 – Jan Antoni Luchini
- 1728–1729 – Stanisław Markiowicz
- 1729–1731 – Marcin Waleszyński
- 1731–1732 – Franciszek Kalewski
- 1732–1734 – Marcin Waleszyński
- 1734–1735 – Maciej Ziętkiewicz
- 1735–1737 – Jan Antoni Luchini
- 1737–1738 – Piotr Aleksander Szymakowski
- 1738–1740 – Jan Antoni Luchini
- 1740–1741 – Kazimierz Pałaszowski
- 1741–1743 – Jan Antoni Luchini
- 1743–1744 – Wojciech Myciński
- 1744–1746 – Kazimierz Pałaszowski
- 1746–1747 – Jan Antoni Luchini
- 1747–1749 – Stanisław Filipowicz
- 1749–1750 – Kazimierz Pałaszowski
- 1750–1752 – Stanisław Filipowicz
- 1752–1753 – Wojciech Myciński
- 1753–1754 – Stanisław Mamczyński
- 1754–1756 – Stanisław Filipowicz
- 1756–1757 – Kazimierz Pałaszowski
- 1757–1758 – Józef Grzegorz Popiołek
- 1758–1759 – Stanisław Filipowicz
- 1759–1760 – Stanisław Mamczyński
- 1760–1762 – Kazimierz Jarmundowicz
- 1762–1763 – Kazimierz Stęplowski
- 1763–1765 – Wojciech Biegaczewicz
- 1765–1766 – Kazimierz Stęplowski
- 1766–1768 – Jakub Marciszowski
- 1768–1769 – Kazimierz Stęplowski
- 1769–1771 – Antoni Żołędziowski
- 1771–1772 – Jakub Marciszowski
- 1772–1774 – Jan Rygalski
- 1774–1775 – Antoni Mikołaj Krząnowski
- 1775–1777 – Andrzej Dominik Lipiewicz

== Szkoła Główna Koronna (1777–1795) ==
- 1777–1782 – Antoni Żołędziowski
- 1782–1786 – Hugo Kołłątaj
- 1786–1790 – Feliks Oraczewski
- 1790–1797 – Józef Tomasz Szabel

== Szkoła Główna Krakowska (1795–1805) ==
- 1797-1805 – Stanisław Minocki

From 1805 to 1809 tied to the University of Lviv and Germanized.

- 1805 – Jakub Kraus
- 1805–1806 – Jan Nepomucen Hoffmann
- 1806–1807 – Franciszek Marx
- 1807–1808 – Jan Morak
- 1808 – Antoni Szaster
- 1808–1809 – Franciszek Kodesch

Repolonized after Cracow joined the Duchy of Warsaw.

- 1809–1814 – Sebastian Sierakowski
- 1814–1817 – Walenty Litwiński

== Jagiellonian University ==
=== 1817–1899 ===
- 1817–1821 – Walenty Litwiński
- 1821–1823 – Sebastian Girtler
- 1823–1826 – Józef Bonawentura Załuski
- 1826–1831 – Sebastian Girtler
- 1831–1833 – Alojzy Estreicher
- 1833–1835 – Karol Hube
- 1835–1837 – Józef Wincenty Łańcucki
- 1837–1839 – Antoni Matakiewicz
- 1839–1841 – Maciej Józef Brodowicz
- 1841–1843 – Jan Kajetan Trojański
- 1843–1845 – Leon Laurysiewicz
- 1845–1847 – Adam Szymon Krzyżanowski
- 1847–1848 – Maciej Józef Brodowicz
- 1848–1851 – Józef Majer
- 1851–1852 – Florian Sawiczewski
- 1852 – Karol Teliga
- 1853–1860 – No rectors elected; the university was headed by Piotr Bartynowski.
- 1860–1861 – Piotr Bartynowski
- 1861–1862 – Józef Dietl
- 1862–1863 – Ignacy Rafał Czerwiakowski
- 1863–1864 – Karol Teliga
- 1864–1865 – Antoni Wachholz
- 1865 – Julian Dunajewski
- 1865–1866 – Józef Majer
- 1866–1867 – Franciszek Tomasz Bratranek
- 1867–1868 – Karol Teliga
- 1868–1869 – Julian Dunajewski
- 1869–1870 – Fryderyk Skobel
- 1870–1871 – Józef Kremer
- 1871–1872 – Karol Teliga
- 1872–1873 – Edward Fierich
- 1873–1874 – Gustaw Piotrowski
- 1874–1875 – Emilian Czyrniański
- 1875–1877 – Fryderyk Zoll, Sr.
- 1877–1878 – Ludwik Karol Teichmann
- 1878–1879 – Józef Szujski
- 1879–1880 – Julian Dunajewski
- 1880–1881 – Maurycy Madurowicz
- 1881–1882 – Stefan Ludwik Kuczyński
- 1882–1883 – Józef Sebastian Pelczar
- 1883–1884 – Udalryk Heyzmann
- 1884–1885 – Lucjan Rydel
- 1885–1886 – Józef Łepkowski
- 1886–1887 – Stanisław Tarnowski
- 1887–1888 – Stanisław Spis
- 1888–1889 – Franciszek Kasparek
- 1889–1890 – Edward Korczyński
- 1890–1891 – Wincenty Zakrzewski
- 1891–1892 – Władysław Chotkowski
- 1892–1894 – Stanisław Madeyski
- 1894–1895 – Tadeusz Browicz
- 1895–1896 – Stanisław Smolka
- 1896–1897 – Feliks Kreutz
- 1897–1898 – Władysław Knapiński
- 1898–1899 – Józef Kleczyński
- 1899–1900 – Stanisław Tarnowski

=== 1900–1999 ===
- 1900–1901 – Maciej Jakubowski
- 1901–1902 – Edward Janczewski-Glinka
- 1902–1903 – Tadeusz Gromnicki
- 1903–1904 – Edmund Krzymuski
- 1904–1905 – Napoleon Cybulski
- 1905–1906 – Stefan Pawlicki
- 1906–1907 – Kazimierz Morawski
- 1907–1908 – Franciszek Gabryl
- 1908–1909 – Franciszek Fierich
- 1909–1910 – Józef Łazarski
- 1910–1911 – August Witkowski
- 1911–1912 – Władysław Szajnocha
- 1912–1913 – Fryderyk Zoll, Jr.
- 1913–1916 – Kazimierz Kostanecki
- 1916–1917 – Władysław Szajnocha
- 1917–1918 – Kazimierz Żorawski
- 1918–1919 – Maciej Sieniatycki
- 1919–1921 – Stanisław Estreicher
- 1921–1922 – Julian Nowak
- 1922–1923 – Władysław Natanson
- 1923–1924 – Jan Łoś
- 1924–1925 – Kazimierz Zimmermann
- 1925–1926 – Michał Rostworowski
- 1926–1928 – Leon Marchlewski
- 1928–1929 – Józef Kallenbach
- 1929–1930 – Henryk Ferdynand Hoyer
- 1930–1931 – Edmund Załęski
- 1931–1932 – Konstanty Michalski
- 1932–1933 – Stanisław Kutrzeba
- 1933–1936 – Stanisław Maziarski
- 1936–1938 – Władysław Szafer
- 1938–1939 – Tadeusz Lehr-Spławiński
- 1942–1945 – Władysław Szafer
- 1945–1946 – Tadeusz Lehr-Spławiński
- 1946–1948 – Franciszek Walter
- 1948–1956 – Teodor Marchlewski
- 1956–1958 – Zygmunt Grodziński
- 1958–1962 – Stefan Grzybowski
- 1962–1964 – Kazimierz Lepszy
- 1964–1972 – Mieczysław Klimaszewski
- 1972–1977 – Mieczysław Karaś
- 1977–1981 – Mieczysław Hess
- 1981–1987 – Józef Andrzej Gierowski
- 1987–1990 – Aleksander Koj
- 1990–1993 – Andrzej Pelczar
- 1993–1999 – Aleksander Koj
- 1999–2002 – Franciszek Ziejka

=== From 2000 ===
- 1999–2005 – Franciszek Ziejka
- 2005–2012 – Karol Musioł
- 2012–2020 – Wojciech Nowak
- 2020–2024 – Jacek Popiel
- from 2024 – Piotr Jedynak

== Bibliography ==
- "Poczet Rektorów UJ" (in Polish). uj.edu.pl.
- "Historia Uniwersytetu Jagiellońskiego" (in Polish). uj.edu.pl.
- "Uniwersytet Jagielloński" (in Polish). Onet.pl.
