= Petrus Gaszowiec =

15th-century astrologer

Petrus Gaszowiec (c. 1425 in Rozmierz – 1474 in Kraków) (also known as Piotr Gaszowiec, Petro Gassoviecz, Petr Gaschowietz, Petrus de Silesia, Petrus Strzelec) was a Polish astrologer, doctor and professor at the Kraków Academy.

Petrus Gaszowiec probably began his education at the local school in Strzelce Opolskie and subsequently entered the Kraków Academy in the winter semester of 1446. He became a baccalarius in 1448 and in 1452 became a doctor of the arts. He was a student of several other great minds of his era, among them, Jan of Ludzisko, Marcin Król of Żurawice, and Andrzej Grzymała from Poznań.

In 1452 he left for Perugia in Italy, where he studied medicine and astronomy. He continued these studies in Cologne in 1454–1455, under the supervision of Gerard of Hamnont.

Gaszowiec finally returned to Kraków in 1456 and took up a post as the court doctor of Casimir IV Jagiellon. In that same year, he also joined the faculty of medicine at the Kraków Academy and began lecturing there as a doctor of medicine. He served as dean of the medical faculty in 1459 and 1462, as well as rector of the whole academy in the winter of 1464–65 and the summers of 1465 and 1470.

In 1459 he married a wealthy townswoman named Katarzyna Homanówna, and together they had nine children.

Gaszowiec also pursued astronomical research, leaving behind works used by the subsequent generation of astronomers, including Nicholas Copernicus. Among other texts, he wrote Computus nouus totus fere Astronomie fundametum pulcerrimum contines and constructed numerous astronomical tables. In 1453, Gaszowiec worked out a catalogue of fifteen fixed stars. The Almanach Cracoviense ad annum 1474, which is the oldest surviving document printed on Polish soil, was most likely written by Gaszowiec. It was published by Kasper Straube, a Bavarian printer who worked in Kraków from 1473 to 1476. Similar to other calendars and almanacs of the era, the Almanach Cracoviense lists church holy days alongside astronomical data. It also contains information such as the most astrologically propitious days for letting blood, according to the age and health of the patient. The only surviving copy of the document is held by the Jagiellonian Library.

In addition to his medical and astronomical pursuits, Gaszowiec also dabbled in magic. It is probable that he was partly responsible for the copying of the Picatrix and for bringing that text from Italy to Poland. The book, which was likely written by the Arabic author al-Majriti, discusses such topics as the nature of the sky and atmospheric phenomena, the connections between the signs of the zodiac and the planets, as well as the summoning of ghosts.

Petrus Gaszowiec died between 28 January and 18 May 1474.

== Selected works ==
- Tabulae aureae de veris et mediis motibus planetarum
- Consideracio de 15 stellis prime magnitudinis
- De mutationibus aeris
- Almanach Cracoviense ad annum 1474
- Computus nouus totus fere Astronomie fundametum pulcerrimum contines. Kraków: Jan Haller, 1504, 1508, 1514, 1518; Vienna: Hieronymus Vietor, 1513, 1518, 1541; Florian Ungler, 1514, 1524; Scharffenberg, 1528, 1531, 1534, 1541, 1546.

== Bibliography ==
- Birkenmajer, Aleksander. "Polski Słownik Biograficzny," vol. 7, pp. 294–5. 1948.
- Birkenmajer, Aleksander. Astronomowie i astrologowie śląscy w wiekach średnich. Katowice, 1937.
- Sperka, Jerzy. "Nieznane karty z życia Piotra Gaszowca z Rozmierza, doktora medycyny, profesora Uniwersytetu Krakowskiego. Przyczynek do badań dziejów medycyny górnośląskiej w średniowieczu." In Górny Śląsk – dzieje medycyny i farmacji, problemy dokumentacji i metodologii badań, edited by J. M. Dyrda, 51–64. Katowice, 2003.
- Kaczorowski, Włodzimierz. "Śląscy medycy (Piotr Gaszowiec, Jerzy Gorecki, Jan z Grodkowa, Wawrzyniec z Raciborza)." Kalendarz Opolski (1993): 73–75.
- Klaniczay, Gabor, and Eva Pocs. Christian Demonology and popular mythology. Budapest, 2006.
- Markowski, Mieczysław. "Piotr Gaszowiec twórcą krakowskiej komputystyki o zasięgu międzynarodowym". Studia Mediewistyczne (1988).
- Albert Zimmerman, "Die Kölner Universität im Mittelalter: Geistige Wurzeln und soziale Wirklichkeit," (Miscellanea Mediaevalia, 20.), 1989.
- Markowski, Mieczysław. Powstanie polskiej szkoły astronomicznej w Krakowie.
- Rybki, E., ed. Historia astronomii w Polsce. Wrocław, 1975.
- Ligacz, Ryszard. "Uczeni Śląska Opolskiego na Uniwersytecie Jagiellońskim w XV wieku". Opole, 1964.
- Szelińska, Wacława. "Ślązacy w Uniwersytecie Krakowskim w XV i XVI wieku w świetle ich książek i księgozbiorów." Katowice, 1997.
- Rostafiński, Józef. Medycyna na Uniwersytecie Jagiellońskim w XV wieku. Szkic źródłowy i krytyczny. Kraków, 1900.
- Białkowski, Leon. "Ród Czamborów Rogalów w dawnych wiekach." „Rocznik Towarzystwa Heraldycznego we Lwowie, R.6, 1923.
- Kaczmarczyk, Kazimierz. Księgi przyjęć do prawa miejskiego w Krakowie 1392-1505. Kraków, 1913.
- Nadolski, Bronisław. "Humanistyczne mowy Piotra Gaszowca". In Pamiętnik Literacki, edited by Bronisław Gubrynowicz. Lwów, 1931.
- Smykała, Piotr, and Romuald Kubik. "Królewski medyk." Strzelec Opolski 674 (25): 2012
- Kremer, Richard L. “‘Abbreviating’ the Alfonsine Tables in Cracow: The Tabulae Aureae of Petrus Gaszowiec (1448).” Journal for the History of Astronomy 38 (2007): 283–304.
