= Kurzelów =

- Village
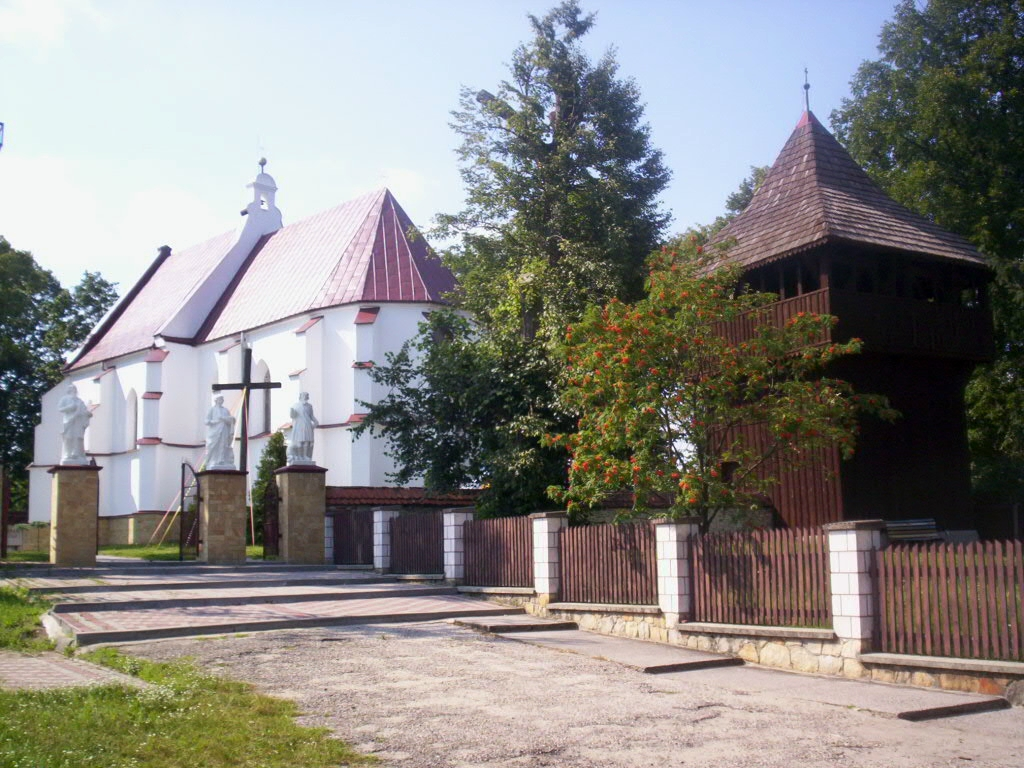
- Assumption church

- Location within Poland
- Coordinates: 50°53′N 19°53′E
- Country: Poland
- Voivodeship: Świętokrzyskie
- County: Włoszczowa
- Gmina: Włoszczowa
- Population: 1,200

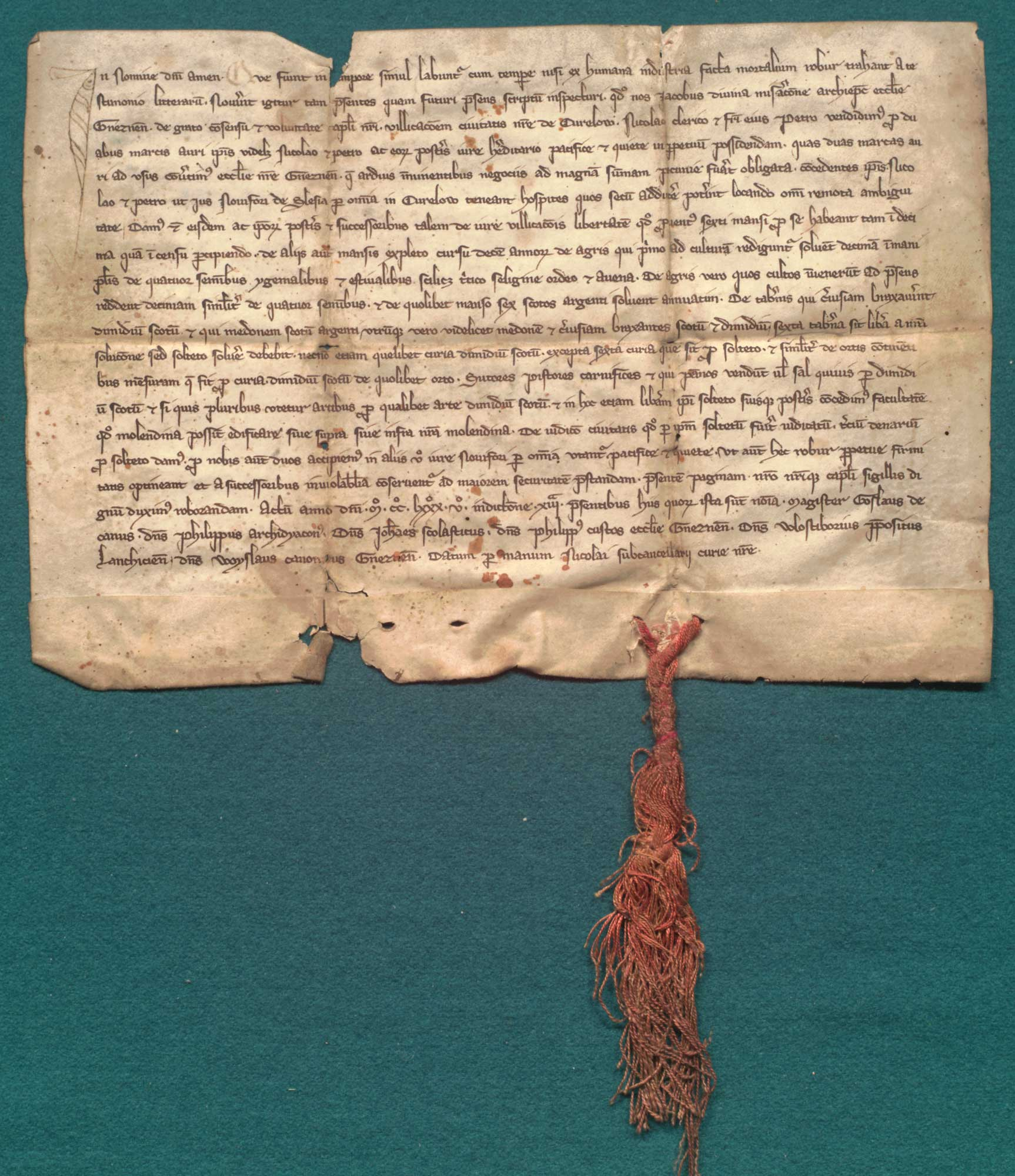
In 1285, Jakub Świnka introduced town rights of Kurzelów modelled on the Średzkie rights (the local condition of Magdeburg rights).

Kurzelów [kuˈʐɛluf] is a village (from 1285 to 1869 it was a town) in the administrative district of Gmina Włoszczowa, within Włoszczowa County, Świętokrzyskie Voivodeship, in south-central Poland. It lies in historic Lesser Poland, approximately 7 km (4 mi) north-west of Włoszczowa and 52 km (32 mi) west of the regional capital Kielce.

== History ==
=== 12th–17th century ===
The name of the village probably comes from a person named Kurzel, who was its first owner in the 11th century. After the death of Duke Wladyslaw Herman, a defensive gord was established here. The gord was destroyed in the winter of 1108, during a civil war in the Kingdom of Poland, between Duke Boleslaw Krzywousty, and his brother Duke Zbigniew. In 1136, a Roman Catholic parish was established at Kurzelów, and at that time, the village probably belonged to the Gniezno Archbishops. In 1259 or 1260, the village was burned in a Tatar raid (see Mongol invasion of Poland), and in 1285, Archbishop Jakub Swinka granted Kurzelów the Sroda Slaska town charter.

In the 14th century Kurzelów quickly developed, due to two reasons: convenient location along a merchant route from Kraków to Przedborz, and the support of the Archbishops, who turned the local church into a collegiate of St. Adalbert of Prague. In 1306, Kurzelów became the seat of an archdeaconry, which ruled 72 local parishes. In 1342 – 1360, Archbishop Jaroslaw of Bogoria and Skotnik founded here a new, brick collegiate church of St. Mary. The ancient wooden church was preserved until the 18th century.

In the late 14th century, Kurzelów became one of favorite locations of Archbishop Bodzanta, and in 1425, a synod of Polish bishops took place here. Kurzelów prospered in the Polish Golden Age, when it belonged to Lesser Poland's Sandomierz Voivodeship, and received privileges from Zygmunt Stary and Stefan Batory. The decline began in the early 17th century, and one of the causes was that the town frequently changed owners. Complete destruction of Kurzelów was brought by the Swedish invasion of Poland, and the town never recovered after the wars of 1655 – 1660.

==== Education ====
In Kurzelów, the first school was established before 1369. During the reorganisation of the collegiate by archbishop Jarosław Bogoria Skotnicki on 24 October 1369, a collegiate church school was established here. In 1651, Jan Brożek has donated the school, and the Kraków Academy (now Jagiellonian University) is taken care of the school. The alumni of the schools received good results of scientific research, especially in maths and astronomy. The school's alumni were:

- Stanisław Jakobczyk -astronomer, medical doctor, theologian, dean Faculty of Arts (Artium, 1571)
- Jan Muscenius (Mucha) -astronomer, mathematician, rector of the Jagiellonian University (1592-1593, 1594–1595, 1599–1600, 1601–1602)
- Paweł Herka -astronomer, mathematician, theologian, rector of the Jagiellonian University (1648)
- Jan Brożek -polymath, astronomer, mathematician, medical doctor, rector of the Jagiellonian University (1652)
- and at least three other professors of the Kraków Academy (now Jagiellonian University).

The astronomers from Kurzelów (Stanisław Jakobczyk, Jan Muscenius and Jan Brożek) were supporters of the Copernicus theory. Jan Brożek was Copernicus' first biographer.

=== 18th–19th century ===
Following the Partitions of Poland, Kurzelów briefly belonged to the Habsburg Empire, and in 1815 – 1915, it was part of the Russian-controlled Congress Poland. The town further declined, and lost its Roman Catholic deanery, when it was moved to Wloszczowa. Residents of Kurzelów actively supported the January Uprising, for which Russian government decided to punish the town, reducing it to the status of the village in 1869.

=== 20th–21st century ===
In the Second Polish Republic, Kurzelów belonged to Kielce Voivodeship, and during World War II, it was an important center of anti-German resistance. On November 27, 1943, the Wehrmacht burned the village to the ground, shooting 18 residents.

Main point of interest of Kurzelów is the Gothic collegiate church from 1360, whose vault is supported by one pillar. Inside there is a Gothic baptismal font (1414), and next to the church is a wooden bell tower (late 17th century).
