= Szajnocha =

Szajnocha is a Polish-language family name. It is a Polonized form of the ancestors' surname (Scheinoha, Germanized spelling of Czech surname Šeinoha), first used by Karol Szajnocha. The surname may refer to:

- Karol Szajnocha (1818–1868), Polish writer, historian, and independence activist
- Władysław Szajnocha (1857–1928), Polish geologist, and paleontologist
