= Piotr Jedynak =

Polish economist (born 1972)

- Born: 10 September 1972 (age 53)
- Citizenship: Polish
- Education: AGH
- Occupation: Economist

Piotr Michał Jedynak (born 10 November 1972) is an economist, business manager and rector of the Jagiellonian University from 2024.

== Biography ==
In 1996 he graduated with a master's degree from AGH. In 1998 he obtained doctorate from the Akademia Ekonomiczna. In 2009 he obtained habilitation. In 2019 he received the title of professor. He supervised four doctoral dissertations.

At the Jagiellonian University, he served as director of the Institute of Economics, Finance and Management (2012–2016), Dean of the Faculty of Management and Social Communication (2016–2020) and Vice-Rector for Human Resources and Financial Policy (2020–2024).

== Books ==
- Zarządzanie ryzykiem. Wrocław-Warszawa-Kraków: Ossolineum. 1997. Co-author.
- Polityka ubezpieczeń w przedsiębiorstwie. Kraków: Wydawnictwo UJ. 1999.
- Zarządzanie ryzykiem w przedsiębiorstwach zorientowanych międzynarodowo. Kraków: Księgarnia Akademicka. 2001. Co-author.
- Ubezpieczenia gospodarcze. Wybrane elementy teorii i praktyki. Kraków: Księgarnia Akademicka. 2001. Second edition: 2003.
- Audyt w zarządzaniu przedsiębiorstwem. Kraków: Księgarnia Akademicka. 2004. Co-author and editor.
- Ocena znormalizowanych systemów zarządzania jakością. Instrumenty i uwarunkowania wartości. Kraków: Wydawnictwo UJ. 2007.
- Wiedza współczesnych organizacji. Wybrane problemy zarządzania. Kraków: Wydawnictwo UJ. 2010. Co-author and editor.
- Znormalizowane systemy zarządzania. Modele, funkcje, wymagania. Kraków: Wydawnictwo UJ. 2011.
