= Emil Czyrniański =

Polish chemist (1824–1888)

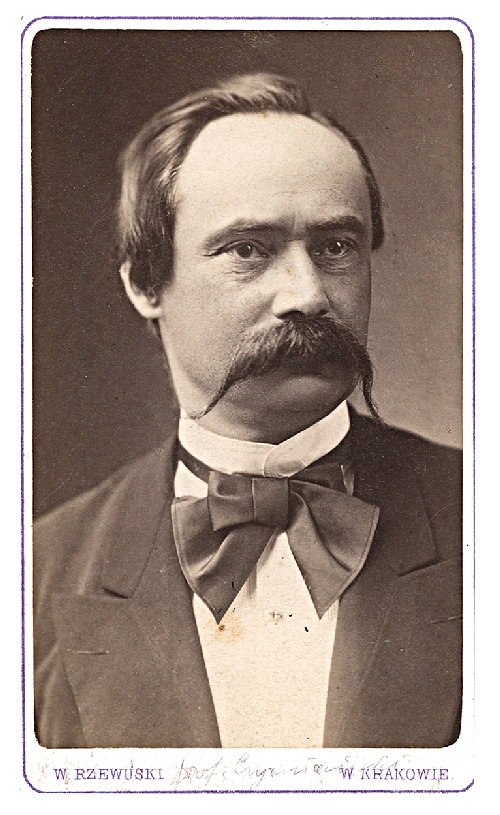
- Emil Czyrniański in 1878 (photograph by Walery Rzewuski)
- Born: 26 January 1824; Florynka, Nowy Sącz County, Poland
- Died: 14 April 1888 (aged 64); Kraków
- Resting place: Rakowicki Cemetery
- Citizenship: Austrian Lemko-Polish
- Education: Technische Akademie Lemberg, now Lviv Polytechnic
- Known for: co-founding of Polish Academy of Learning, Chemical nomenclature in Polish
- Spouse: Freiin Maria Stelzhammer
- Children: Maria Krystyna (mother of Jozef Retinger)
- Awards: Doctor Honoris Causa 1859 from Jagiellonian University
- Scientific career
- Fields: General chemistry and pharmacy
- Workplaces: Jagiellonian University

Emilian (also Emil) Czyrniański (Lemko Rusyn: Емілиян Чырняньскій; January 26, 1824 – April 14, 1888) was a Polish chemist of Lemko descent, science writer, rector of the Jagiellonian University and co-founder of the Polish Academy of Learning. He is responsible for developing chemical nomenclature in Polish. One of his grandsons was the highly influential political activist and writer, Józef Retinger.

== Early life ==
Czyrniański was born on 26 January 1824 in Florynka, Nowy Sącz County, Poland into a Lemko family. His father was the Greek Catholic parish priest and local schools inspector. After leaving school he evinced a vocation for the priesthood. He completed a preparatory theological course in Przemyśl and from 1844 studied in the Theological Department of Lviv University. Within two months of starting, his studies were interrupted by a protracted illness and when he returned to Lwów, in 1846, he was attracted by natural science and chose a new career path by moving to the German-language Technische Akademie. He proved to be a brilliant student and after only one year, in 1847 he became assistant to professor Friedrich Rochleder.

== Scientific career ==
In 1849 Rochleder invited him to be his assistant at Charles University in Prague. There in 1850 he developed an original theory of the causes of chemical bonding which he wrote up in a paper, Wirujące niedziałki ("Swirling particles"). In 1851 at the young age of 27 he began an independent teaching and research career when he was appointed assistant professor in chemistry in Kraków. Soon Czyrniański undertook a systematisation of Polish chemical terminology which he published as Słownictwo polskie chemiczne (1853). His proposal was widely accepted by Polish research chemists. Evidence of his success was that his terminology was adopted for school textbooks in the Kingdom of Galicia and Lodomeria for close on fifty years. This was closely followed by his publication of Wykład chemii nieorganicznej zastosowanej do przemysłu, rolnictwa i medycyny, (An applied inorganic chemistry manual for industry, agriculture and medicine) produced in an accessible language to explain practical applications of chemical science.

In 1859 he became professor of general chemistry and pharmacy at the Jagiellonian University, and was awarded an honorary doctorate. He served there as rector from 1874 to 1875. (See Rectors of the Jagiellonian University 1817–1899)

=== Research ===
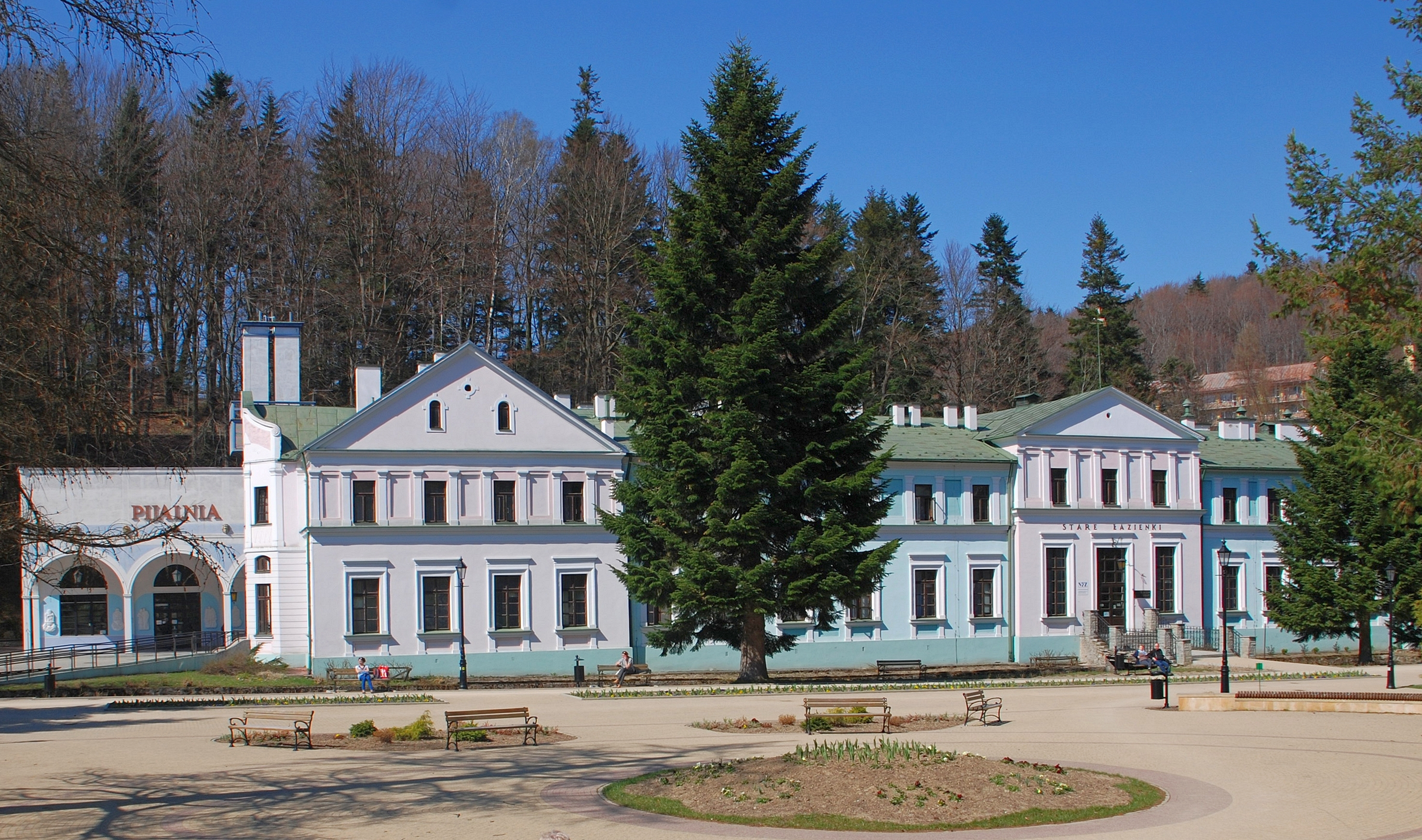
Iwonicz-Zdrój, old sanatorium

Part of his research focused on the chemical analysis of naturally occurring mineral water from the spa towns of Krynica-Zdrój and Iwonicz-Zdrój. As a result of his work, the medicinal trend to "take the waters" in those resorts grew exponentially. His other research included such areas as:

- Teoryja tworzenia się połączeń chemicznych na podstawie ruchu wirowego atomów, (A theory of chemical bonding based on the swirling movement of atoms). 1862
- Rozwinięcie krytyczne teoryi chemicznej opartej na ruchach wirowych niedziałek, (The development of a critical theory of chemistry based on the swirling of particles). 1876
- Teoryja mechaniczno-chemiczna oparta na ruchach wirowych niedziałek, (A mechanical-chemical theory based on the movement of particles). 1876
- Teoryja chemiczno-fizyczna na podstawie przyciągania się i ruchu wirowego niedziałek, (A physical and chemical theory based on the attraction and swirling of particles). 1884

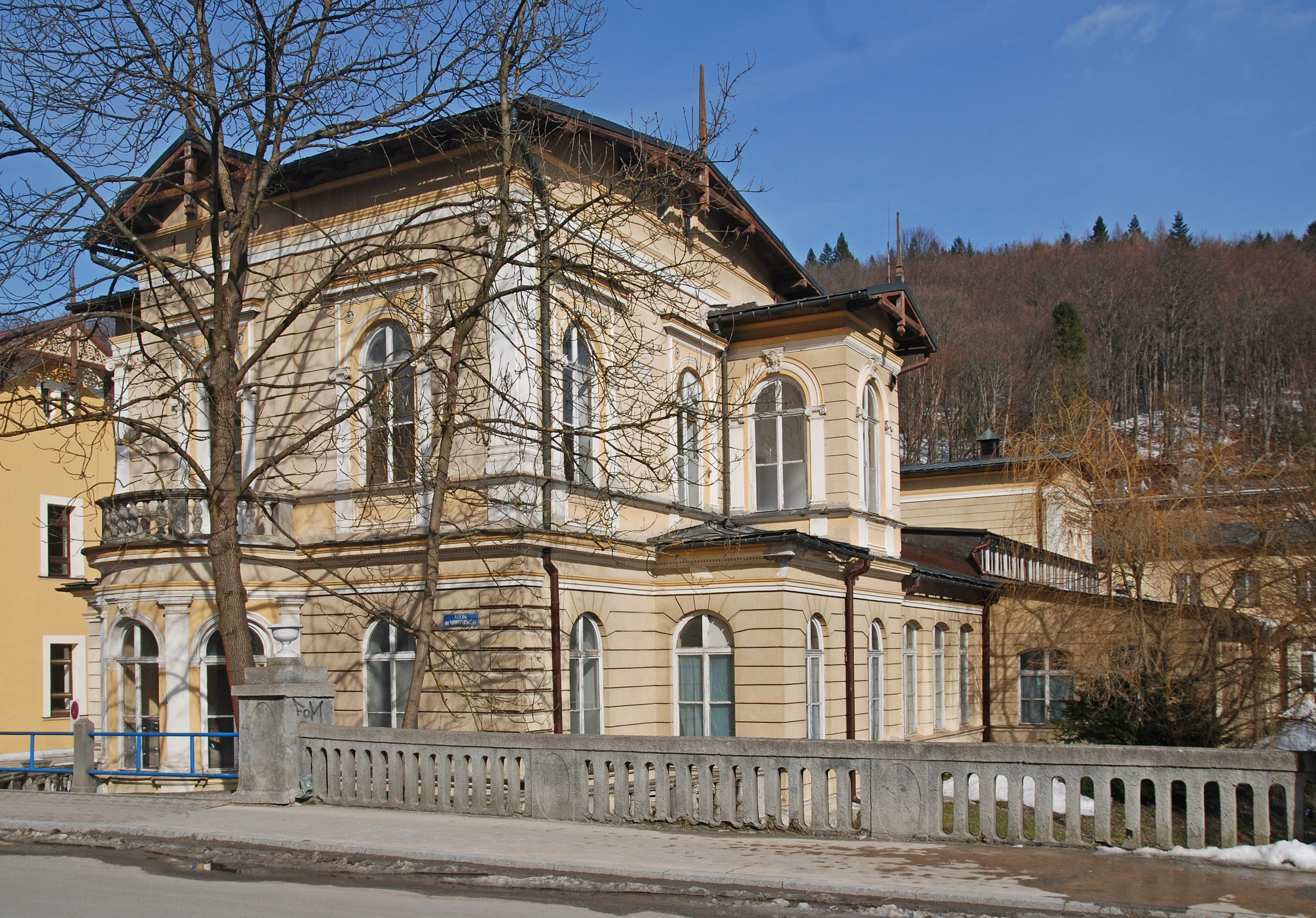
Krynica-Zdrój, spa mud baths

He completed a synthesis of chemical science as it stood in his day, devoting three separate textbooks to the fields of organic and inorganic chemistry:

- Chemija nieorganiczna i organiczna zastosowana do przemysłu, rolnictwa i lékarstwa (t. 1-2, 1866–1867) on (inorganic and organic chemistry and its applications in industry, agriculture and in pharmacies), in two volumes. 1866-67
- Chemija nieorganiczna ułożona dla uniwersytetów i akademij technicznych on (inorganic chemistry for use in universities and technical academies). 1874
- Chemija nieorganiczna mniejsza ułożona dla szkół realnych on (elements of inorganic chemistry presented for secondary schools). 1874

=== Political opposition ===
His early years at the University were difficult as he waged a single-handed battle with the occupying Austrian authorities by insisting on taking courses in Polish and not in the prescribed German. His political stance brought him close to dismissal from his academic post.

== Death ==
Czyrniański died suddenly of a heart attack on 14 April 1888 in Kraków, three days before his daughter gave birth to his grandson, Józef Retinger. He was buried at the Rakowicki Cemetery.

== Bibliography ==
- Theorie auf der rotirenden Bewegung der Atome basirt (in German).
- Neue Chemische Theorie Durchgeführt Durch Alle Unorganischen Verbindungen in Allgemeinen Formeln (in German).

== See also ==
- List of Poles
