= Jan Muscenius =

Jan Muscenius, (Jan Muszczeński alias Jan Mucha, 1532 – 21 July 1602) was a Polish astronomer, theologian, and the rector of Kraków Academy (now Jagiellonian University).

== Life ==
Jan Muscenius was born in Kurzelów, Sandomierz Province, and lived in Kraków.

He received his primary education in Kurzelow, then continued education in Krakow. In 1550, he enrolled in the Faculty of Liberal Art at the Kraków Academy (now Jagiellonian University). In August 1558, he became the head of the Astronomy and Astrology Faculty.

From 29 April 1556 to 24 February 1559, he was a rector of the Wawel cathedral school. On 23 September 1558 became the member of the Collegium Minor (Kolegium Mniejszego).

Jan Muscenius was four times the rector of the Kraków Academy (1592/1593, 1594/1595, 1599/1600, 1601/1602)

Muscenius divided his book collection between Kraków Academy and the collegiate church at Kurzelów. The University of Warsaw Library has 59 beautifully bounded volumes from the Muscenius collection.

== Research ==
On 24 August 1563 and 11 April 1564 together with other astronomers (Piotr Proboszczowic, Mikołaj z Szadka, Stanisław Jakobejusz) from the Krakow Academy observed the Jupiter and Saturn conjunctions (Greate conjunction). The observations showed that the mathematical method of the planets position calculation presented by Copernicus in De revolutionibus orbium coelestium are more accurate than previously used the Alfonsine tables and Albert Brudzewski tables. This result popularised to use the numerical values of the planets position according Copernicus, but not necessary to Copernican heliocentrism.

He provided 1649 the pre-instrumental weather condition observations between 1555 and 1568.

== Publications ==
- Epigrammata In Lavdem XI. Eximiorvm Ac Ervditorum virorum : dum In Alma Academia Cracovien[si] A. D. III. Eidus Martij Anno CIƆ IƆCI. A [...] Ioanne Muscenio Curzelouio [...] Licentiati in artibus liberalibus & Philosophia [...] crearentur, published in Kraków, (1601)
- Praktyka z Biegow Niebieskich na Rok Panski 1566
- Kalendarz Świąt dorocznych y Biegów Niebieskich z wyborami czasów na Rok Pański 1569, pierwszy po Przestępnym przez M. Jana Musceniusa z Kurzelowa, sławnej Nauki Krakowskiey Astrologa, napisany.
