= Florynka =

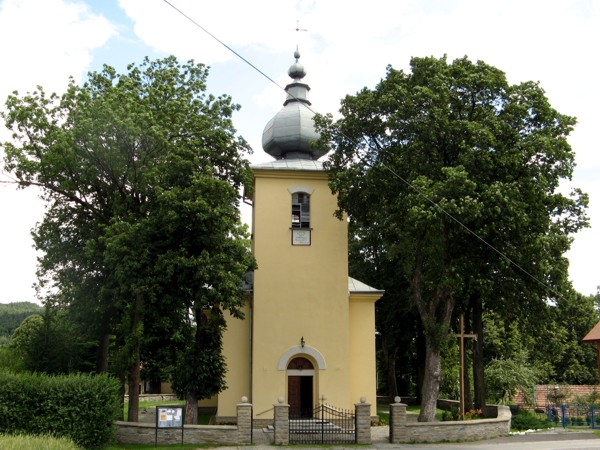
- Roman Catholic church (formerly Greek Catholic)
- Interactive map of Florynka
- Location within Poland
- Coordinates: 49°34′N 20°59′E
- Country: Poland
- Voivodeship: Lesser Poland
- County: Nowy Sącz
- Gmina: Grybów
- Time zone: UTC+1 (CET)
  - Summer (DST): UTC+2 (CEST)
- Postal code: 33-332
- Area code: +48 18
- Car plates: KNS

Florynka [flɔˈrɨŋka] (Ukrainian: Фльоринка, Fliorynka) is a village in southern Poland, in the commune of Grybów, Nowy Sącz County, Lesser Poland Voivodeship.

== History ==
- 1785 – 745 Greek Catholics, 10 Roman Catholics, the village lands comprised 20.22 km^{2}
- 1840 – 992 Greek Catholics
- 1859 – 1205 Greek Catholics
- 1879 – 928 Greek Catholics
- 1899 – 1150 Greek Catholics
- 1926 – 1108 Greek Catholics
- 1936 – 228 Greek Catholics – village switched to Orthodoxy, afterwards there were 1246 Orthodox, 57 Roman Catholics and 37 Jews

Florynka was the place of origin of the short-lived Lemko-Rusyn Republic from 1918 to 1920. The village was incorporated into the Lemko Apostolic Administration in 1934.

The Lemko inhabitants of the village were removed in Operation Vistula in 1947, and scattered to 30 different villages in 6 counties.

== Church ==
The Saint Michael Church was built in 1875 and survived to this day. The village Vafka 3 km away was served by the priest Florynka.

== Notable people from Florynka ==
- Emil Czyrniański (1824–1888), chemist
- Walery Jaworski (1849–1924), physician
