= Walery Jaworski =

Polish gastroenterologist (1849–1924)

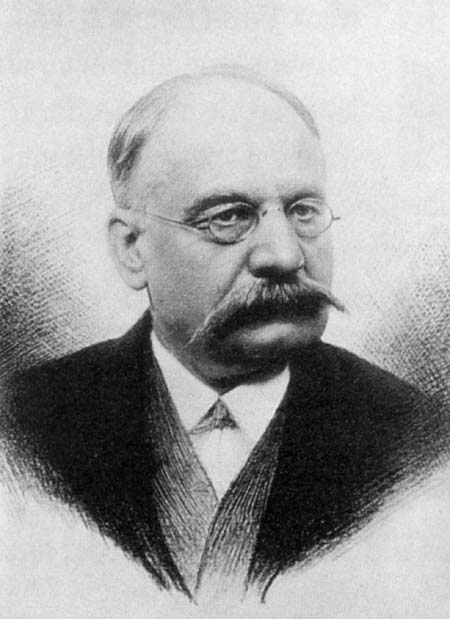
- Jaworski ca. 1910.
- Born: 20 March 1849; Florynka, Austrian Empire
- Died: 17 July 1924 (aged 75); Kraków, Poland
- Education: Lviv Polytechnic; Jagiellonian University
- Known for: First observation of Helicobacter pylori
- Scientific career
- Fields: Medicine; Gastrology
- Workplaces: Jagiellonian University

Walery Jaworski (March 20, 1849, in Florynka – July 17, 1924, in Kraków) was a Polish physician and gastroenterologist. He is considered one of the pioneers of gastroenterology in Poland. He is also known for making one of the first observations of Helicobacter pylori in 1899.

== Life and career ==
He was born in 1849 in Florynka, Austrian Empire. In 1868, he graduated from secondary school in Przemyśl. Between 1868-1871, he studied at the Lviv Polytechnic (Polish: Akademia Techniczna we Lwowie). In 1874, he started studying medicine at the Jagiellonian University and graduated in 1880.

In 1899 he described bacteria living in the human stomach that he named Vibrio rugula. He speculated that they were responsible for stomach ulcers, gastric cancer and achylia. It was one of the first observations of Helicobacter pylori. He published those findings in 1899 in a book titled Podręcznik chorób żołądka (Handbook of Gastric Diseases) but it was available only in Polish and went unnoticed.

His findings were independently confirmed by Robin Warren and Barry Marshall, who received the Nobel Prize in 2005.

He is also considered one of the pioneers of radiology in Poland. In 1900, he founded Europe's first Museum of the History of Medicine in Kraków.

== See also ==
- List of Polish physicians
- Timeline of Polish science and technology
