= Friedrich Rochleder =

Austrian chemist (1819–1874)

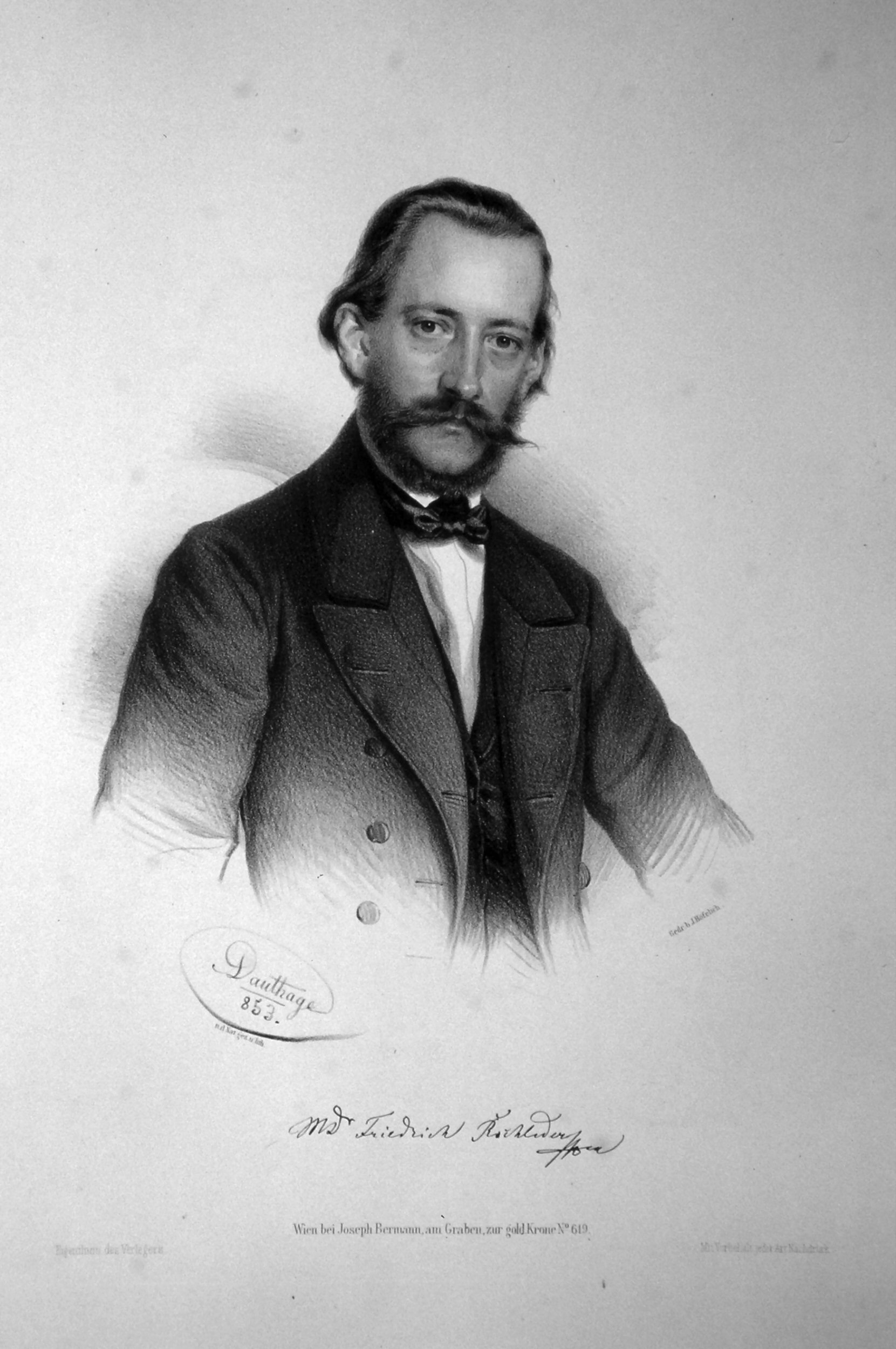
Rochleder in 1858

Friedrich Rochleder (15 May 1819 – 5 November 1874) was an Austrian chemist.

== Life ==
Rochleder was born on 15 May 1819 in Vienna, Austrian Empire. Son of pharmacist Anton Rochleder, he studied medicine at the University of Vienna, earning his doctorate in 1842. Afterwards he studied chemistry in Giessen with Justus von Liebig (1803–1873), followed by several months spent in Paris and London. In 1845 he was appointed professor of technical chemistry at the newly founded technical academy in Lviv. Later he served as professor of chemistry at Charles University in Prague (1849), and professor of general and pharmaceutical chemistry at the University of Vienna (1870). In 1848 he became a full member of the Academy of Sciences in Vienna.

== Written works ==
Most of his scientific research dealt with plant chemistry, and he was the author of numerous papers involving chemical analyses of various plants and plant substances such as gall, tannin, gardenia, oregano, the roots of Rubia tinctorum, the plant families Rubiaceae and Ericaceae, horse chestnut, the flavonol-quercetin, cassia, Scots pine, et al. The following are some of his better known publications:

- Beitrage zur Phytochemie, 1847
- Die Genussmittel und Gewurze in chemischer Beziehung, 1852
- Phytochemie, 1854
- Chemie und Physiologie der Pflanzen, 1858
- Anleitung zur Analyse von Pflanzen und Pflanzentheilen, 1858
- "Proximate analysis of plants and vegetable substances", published in English in 1862.
