= Jan Brożek =

Polish mathematician (1585–1652)

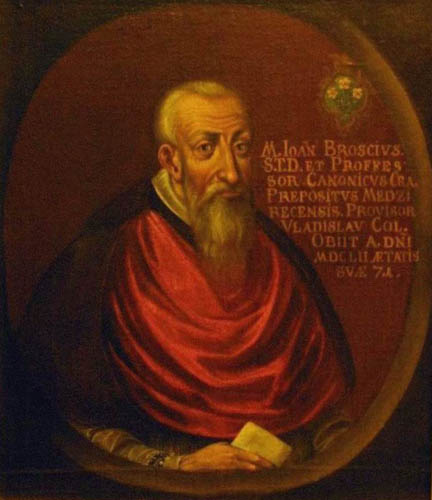
- Born: Jan Brożek Kurzelów, Poland
- Died: 21 November 1652 (aged 67); Bronowice Małe, Poland
- Education: Kraków Academy
- Known for: Research on perfect numbers and geometry honeycomb conjecture
- Scientific career
- Fields: Mathematics; astronomy; medicine; poetry; music
- Workplaces: Kraków Academy

Jan Brożek or Johannes Broscius (Note: Brożek published his works under a Latinized version of his name) (November 1585 – 21 November 1652) was the most prominent Polish mathematician of his era and an early biographer of Copernicus. He held numerous ecclesiastical offices in the Catholic Church and was associated with the Kraków Academy for his entire career.

== Life ==
Brożek was born in Kurzelów, a village in south-central Poland. His father, Jakub, was an educated landowner who introduced Jan to the principles of geometry. He received his primary education in Kurzelow, then continued his education in Krakow. In 1604, he enrolled in the Kraków Academy (now Jagiellonian University), where he received his baccalaureate on 30 March 1605. In 1610, he earned a magister degree (equivalent to a doctorate). His association with the Belgian mathematician, Adriaan van Roomen, greatly influenced his studies.

In early 1614, Brożek was appointed professor of astrology at the Kraków Academy. In 1618 he travelled to Toruń, Gdańsk (then known as Danzig), and Frombork gathering material for a biography on Nicolaus Copernicus. He also became adept at land surveys. Between 1616 and 1620, Brożek surveyed the boundaries of Krakow’s bishopric and made measurements for maps of the Dominican Order’s property near Krakow.

Beginning in 1620, he studied medicine at Padua, Italy and earned a doctorate in 1623. In Padua, Brożek became friends with Giovanni Camillo Glorioso, who in 1613 had succeeded Galileo in the chair of mathematics at the university. Afterward he served as physician to the bishop of Krakow until 1625.

Around this time, Brożek became embroiled in a long-running dispute between the Jesuits and the university. He sided with the university's efforts to maintain independence from Jesuit dominance. In 1625, he wrote a pamphlet, Gratis, that was critical of the Jesuits. The printer of the pamphlet was arrested, whipped and exiled from Krakow. Brożek escaped serious punishment only because of his association with the university. Between 1627 and 1635, Brożek wrote reports to Rome and made ten trips to Warsaw, advocating for university independence and petitioning the royal court to defend their rights.

In 1629 he was ordained a priest and then between 1632 and 1638 he served as custodian at the university library. In 1639 he donated his extensive personal library to the university and also provided a substantial sum of money to purchase additional books and instruments. Shortly afterwards, he gave up his professorship and moved to Międzyrzec Podlaski. However, in 1648 Brożek returned to Krakow University and received a masters in theology. He earned a doctor of theology in 1650.

In addition to his university positions, Brożek held a number of ecclesiastical positions. He became a canon of various collegiate churches in Krakow, and earned stipends from several priories. He was later nominated canon at the Wawel Cathedral, a significant and lucrative posting.

Brożek was appointed rector of the university in 1652, a prestigious assignment, but served only briefly. That same year the plague decimated the populace in Krakow and Brożek died on 21 November 1652.

Brożek bequeathed his substantial library and collection of scientific instruments to the university. The library consisted of some 400 volumes on scientific subjects and 300 volumes on humanistic topics. Many of these books have survived. He gifted at least 36 scientific instruments to the school, including surveying and drawing instruments, astronomical devices and clocks. Only three of these instruments are still held by the university, most notably a mechanical armillary sphere known as the Globus Jagellonicus.

One of the Jagiellonian University's buildings, the Collegium Broscianum, is named in his honor.

== Fields of contribution ==
=== Mathematics ===
He was the most prominent Polish mathematician of the 17th century, working on the theory of numbers (particularly perfect numbers) and geometry. While studying perfect numbers, he postulated theorems which were the special cases of the then-unknown Fermat's little theorem. He also studied medicine, theology and geodesy. Among the problems he addressed was why bees create hexagonal honeycombs; he demonstrated that this is the most efficient way of using wax and storing honey.

=== Biography ===
He contributed to a greater knowledge of Nicolaus Copernicus' theories and was his ardent supporter and early prospective biographer. Around 1618 he visited the chapter at Warmia and with the knowledge of Prince-Bishop Simon Rudnicki took from there a number of letters and documents in order to publish them, which he never did. He contributed to a better version of a short biography of Copernicus by Simon Starowolski. "Following his death, his entire collection was lost"; thus "Copernicus' unpublished work probably suffered the greatest damage at the hands of Johannes Broscius."

Brożek wrote a biography of Stanislaw Grzepski, a sixteenth-century Polish mathematician and philologist. He also planned to write a history of the Kraków Academy but only fragments of a manuscript have been found.

== Works ==
Brożek was the author of more than thirty publications, all of them written in Latin. As was common among scholars in his era, he published his works under a Latinized version of his name, Johannes Broscius.

- Geodesia distantiarum (1610);
- Dissertatio astronomica (1616);
- Dissersatio de cometa Astrophili (1619);
- De dierum inaequalitate (1619);
- Arithmetica integrorum (1620);
- Apologja pierwsza kalendarza rzymskiego powszechnego (1641);
- Apologia pro Aristotele et Euclide (1652);
- De numeris perfectis disceptatio (1637);
- Epistolae ad naturam ordinatarum figurarum plenius intelligendam pertinentes (1615);
- Peripatheticus Cracoviensis (1647);
- Sermo in synodo Luceornensi (1641);
- Discurs Ziemianina z Plebanem (Discourse between the Squire and the Vicar, 1625);
  - Gratis, albo Discurs I Ziemianina z Plebanem (Gratis, or Discourse I between the Squire and the Vicar);
  - Przywiley, albo Discurs II Ziemianina z Plebanem (Privilege, or Discourse II between the Squire and the Vicar);
  - Consens, albo Discurs III Ziemianina z Plebanem (Consensus, or Discourse III between the Squire and the Vicar).

== See also ==
- List of Polish people—Astronomy
- List of Polish people—Mathematics
- Perfection—Perfect numbers
- Physician writer
- List of Roman Catholic scientist-clerics

== Sources ==
English

- Chroboczek, Jan (2010). "Jan Brożek: Mathematician, Astronomer and Biographer of Copernicus (1585-1652)". The Polish Review. 55 (2): 169–193. doi:10.2307/25779870. ISSN 0032-2970. JSTOR 25779870. S2CID 254442866.
- Chroboczek, Jan (2013). "Three Letters on Copernicus published by Joannes Broscius in 1618". Sudhoffs Archiv. 97 (1): 1–20. doi:10.25162/sudhoff-2013-0001. ISSN 0039-4564. JSTOR 43694456. PMID 24195331. S2CID 39707505.
- Knaster, B. (1970). "Brożek (or Broscius), Jan". Dictionary of Scientific Biography. New York: Scribner.
- Wyka, Ewa (2009). "Scientific Instruments And The Legacy Of Johannes Broscius, Professor Of The Krakow Academy". European Collections of Scientific Instruments: 1550-1750. Leiden: Brill. ISBN 978-90-04-17270-8.

Polish

- Jan Nepomucen Franke, "Jan Brożek (J. Broscius) Akademik Krakowski..." Jagiellonian University Press, Kraków, 1884;
- "Jan Brożek, Wybór Pism" [Jan Brożek, Selected Writings] Vol. 1, Edit. Henryk Barycz, Vol. 2, Edit. Jadwiga Dianni. P.W.N., Warszawa, 1956;
- Krzysztof Tatarkiewicz "Brzozek czy Brożek, materiały do rozważań w 350 rocznicę..." 2nd Edit. Manuscript available at the RCIN Web page of the Inst. Mat. Pol. Acad. Sci. (IMPAN), Warsaw, deposited by the author in 2003.
