= Franciszek Ziejka =

Polish scholar (1940–2020)

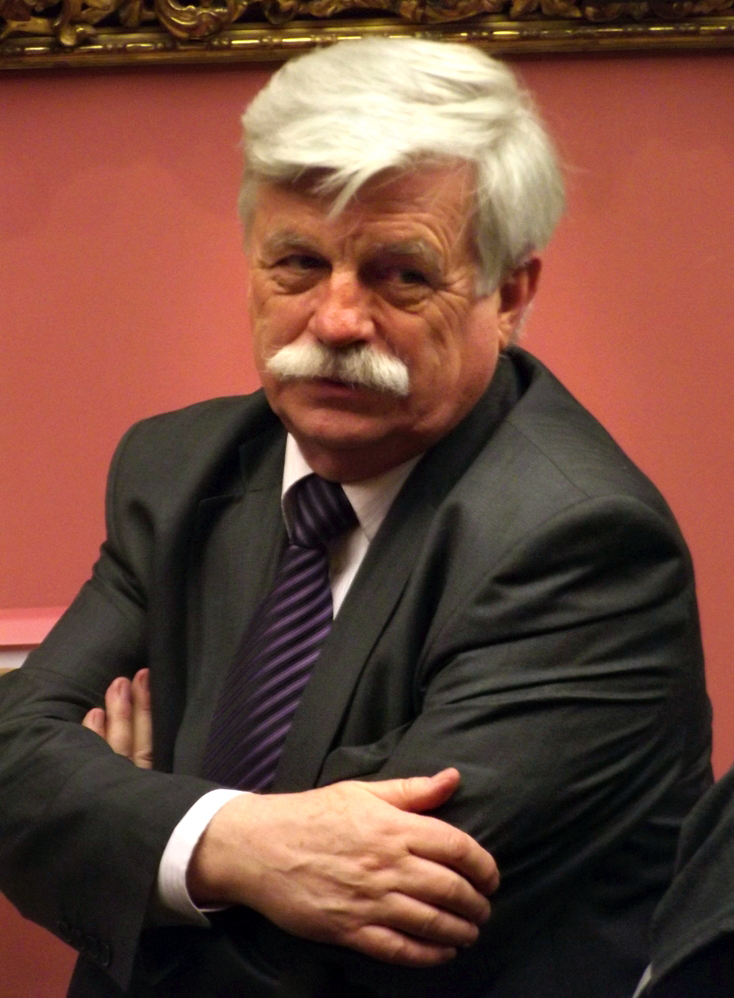
- Professor Franciszek Ziejka
- Born: 3 October 1940; Radłów, German-occupied Poland
- Died: 19 July 2020 (aged 79); Kraków, Poland
- Occupation: Scholar

Franciszek Ziejka (3 October 1940 – 19 July 2020) was a Polish scholar who specialized in Polish literature.

== Biography ==
Ziejka was born into a peasant family of eight children. He studied Polish literature at Jagiellonian University under the guidance of Wacław Kubacki. In 1971, he defended his doctoral thesis on symbolism of Stanisław Wyspiański's The Wedding. In 1982, he supported accreditation in his essay The Golden Legend of Polish Peasants. In 1991, he became a university professor.

In the meantime, Ziejka taught Polish at the University of Provence from 1970 to 1973, then at the University of Lisbon from 1979 to 1980. He also taught at the Institut national des langues et civilisations orientales from 1984 to 1988.

Ziejka became a member of the Polish Academy of Learning in 1997 in Kraków. He was also a member of the Polish Academy of Sciences and the Polish PEN International Club.

Ziejka is the author of multiple plays broadcast on Polish television, such as A Legend is Born, Polish October, and Traugutt. He served on the scientific council of the Polish Library in Paris and he chaired the Panteon Narodowy w Krakowie.

== Distinctions ==
- Officer of the Ordre des Palmes académiques (2002)
- Knight of the Legion of Honour (2006)
- Grand Officer of the Portugal Order of Merit (2008)
- Commander of the Order of Polonia Restituta (2012)
- Order of the Southern Cross
- Order of the Rising Sun

== Doctorates Honoris Causa ==
- Pedagogical University of Cracow
- Pontifical Faculty of Theology of Wrocław
- Jan Kochanowski University
- Pontifical University of John Paul II
- Maria Curie-Skłodowska University

== Awards ==
- Kazimierz Wyka Award (1989)

== Bibliography ==
- W kręgu mitów polskich (1977)
- Studia polsko-prowansalskie (1977)
- Moje spotkania z Portugalią (1983)
- Złota legenda chłopów polskich (1984)
- Dialog serdeczny (1988)
- Paryż młodopolski (1993)
- Nasza rodzina w Europie. Studia i szkice (1995)
- Poeci, misjonarze, uczeni. Z dziejów kultury i literatury polskiej (1998)
- Mythes polonais. Autour de « La Noce » de Stanisław Wyspiański (2001)
- Gaudium veritatis (2005)
- Odkrywanie świata. Rozmowy i szkice (2010)
- Serce Polski. Szkice krakowskie (2010)
