= Andrzej Grzymała =

- Born: Poznań
- Died: September 1466; Kraków
- Occupations: scholar, professor, rector

Academic background
- Education: University of Kraków

Academic work
- Discipline: Rhetoric; Poetry; Astronomy

Andrzej Grzymała of Poznań (died September 1466, Kraków) was a Polish academic and rector of the Cracow Academy in the 15th century.

== Life ==
Grzymała was born in Poznań. In 1422 he matriculated at the university in Cracow, where be earned his baccalarius in 1443 and his magister in 1447. He lectured on poetry and rhetoric from 1443 to 1460). In 1453/1454 and 1458, he served as the dean of the faculty of Liberal Arts.

He spent 1460–1462 in Italy, primarily in Rome, but perhaps also in Perugia, where he probably earned a doctorate in medicine in 1461. In 1464/1465 he served as dean of the faculty of medicine in Cracow, and was twice elected rector of the university. He most likely died in September 1466 during the epidemic.

In addition to poetry and rhetoric, Grzymala also studied astronomy and wrote a text on the use of astronomical tables, titled Canonaes Tabularum Resolutarum. It is the only one of his works currently extant. Several of the books he once owned, on the other hand, have survived. They include copies of Eberhardus Bremensis's Laborintus, Geoffrey of Vinsauf's Poetria Nova, and Leonardo Bruni's Poliscene, which has a commentary possibly attributed to Grzymała.

== Bibliography ==
- Birkenmajer, Aleksander. "Grzymała Andrzej (ok. 1425-1466)." In Polski Słownik Biograficzny, edited by Władysław Konopczyński, 9:114–16. Kraków: Polska Akademia Nauk, 1960.
- Michałowska, Teresa. Literatura polskiego średniowiecz, pp. 30–31. Warsaw: Wydawnictwo Naukowe PWN, 2011.
- Mieczysław, Markowski. Repertorium bio-bibliographicum astronomorum Cracoviensium medii aevi: Adam Tussinus...Andreas Grzymała de Posnania. Studia Mediewistyczne 27, no. 1 (1990): 111–63.
