= Marcin Król of Żurawica =

15th-century astrologer

Marcin Król z Żurawicy (Polish: Marcin Król z Żurawicy; c. 1422–1460), also known as Martinus Ruthenus, Marcin of Żurawica (Polish: Marcin z Żurawicy) Marcin Król of Przemyśl (Polish: Marcin Król z Przemyśla; Latin: Martinus Rex de Premislia), and Martinus Polonus, was a Ruthenian-born Polish mathematician, astronomer, and doctor.

== Life ==
Marcin Król, son of Stanisław Król, was born around 1422 in Żurawica near Przemyśl.

He joined the Cracow Academy to study the liberal arts in 1438. Six years later, he earned his baccalarius. In 1445 he gained the title magister and began to lecture on mathematics and astronomy. That same year, Zbigniew Oleśnicki, the academy's chancellor, arranged for him to study abroad. Król attended the universities in Prague (1445), Leipzig, Padua and Bologna, where he lectured on astronomy in 1448. In December 1449, he earned the title doctor of medicine. Shortly thereafter, Król left for Hungary, where he was the court physician to John Hunyadi. He probably also spent time at the court of John Vitéz w Oradea.

Król returned to Cracow probably in the winter of 1450 through the intervention of Zbigniew Oleśnicki and Jan Długosz, and took up a position as professor at the Cracow Academy. He covered mathematics (geometry) and astronomy, founding the latter department. Sometime after 1450, he also established the department of astrology, which soon developed a European-wide reputation. He kept up close correspondence with other astronomers, including the Austrian Georg von Peuerbach and the German Regiomontanus. In this period Król also served as doctor to the bishop of Cracow.

At his death in 1460, his substantial fortune went, in large part, to the University of Cracow, as was his wish. A small sum also went to his brother Florian, a peasant settled in the family village of Żurawica.

== Works ==
- Nova compilatio algorismi minutiarum.
- Algorismus minuciarum. 1445.
- Summa super Tabulas Alphonsi vel Correctiones Tabularum Alphonsi. 1450–1451(?). Treatise correcting the astronomical tables of 1251.
- Iudicia. Astrological almanacs for 1451 and 1452.
- Opus de geometria. c.1450.
- Canones super calendarium. 1456.

Letters

- From Jan Długosz in Cracow, dated October 1449.
- From Zbigniew Oleśnicki, dated December(?) 1449.

== Footnotes ==
Notes

== Bibliography ==
- Bibliografia Literatury Polskiej – Nowy Korbut, vol. 3 Piśmiennictwo Staropolskie, 461–62. Warsaw: Państwowy Instytut Wydawniczy, 1965 s. 461–462
- Knoll, Paul W. “A Pearl of Powerful Learning”: The University of Cracow in the Fifteenth Century, 381ff. Leiden: Brill, 2016.
- Kuksiewicz, Zdzisław. "Marcin Król z Żurawicy alias z Przemyśla. Materiały i Studia Zakładu Historii Filozofii Starożytnej i Średniowiecznej 1 (1961): 118–40.
- Láng, Benedek. Unlocked Books: Manuscripts of Learned Magic in the Medieval Libraries of Central Europe, 247–49. University Park, PA: Penn State University Press, 2008.
