= Stanisław of Skarbimierz =

Polish academic and Christian religious leader

Stanisław of Skarbimierz (1360–1431; Latinised as Stanislaus de Scarbimiria) was the first rector of the University of Krakow following its restoration in 1399. He was the author of Sermones sapientiales (Polish: Kazania sapiencjalne), comprising 113 sermons.

Stanisław was born in Skalbmierz, a town some 50 km north-east of Kraków. His sermons were the foundation of Polish political doctrine that culminated in the system of Nobles' Democracy ("Golden Liberty") in Poland and, from 1569, in the Polish–Lithuanian Commonwealth. Many ideas central to this doctrine may be found in subsequent works by Wawrzyniec Grzymała Goślicki (1530–1607) that appear to have influenced the 17th-century English Commonwealth as well as the Founding Fathers of the United States.

Along with Paweł Włodkowic, Stanisław framed the Polish position at the Council of Constance, pioneering ideas of modern human rights and international law. His sermons "About Just War" (De bellis justis) and "About robbery" (De rapina) laid foundations of the medieval theory of just war. The sermons justified the position of the Kingdom of Poland in its war against the Teutonic Knights. Stanisław died in 1431 in Kraków.

His Sermons were influenced by earlier works of Augustine of Hippo and Wincenty Kadłubek.
