= Władysław Szajnocha =

Polish geologist

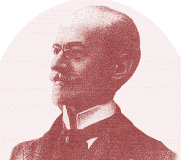
Władysław Szajnocha

Władysław Szajnocha (1857-1928) was a Polish geologist and paleontologist; son of historian Karol Szajnocha. Rector of the Jagiellonian University (1911-1912 and 1916-1917).
