= List of Polish printers =

A list of notable printing people from and working in Poland:

== A ==
- Izaak Aaronowicz
- Jan Franciszek Adametz
- Alfred Altenberg
- Wacław Anczyc
- Łazarz Andrysowicz
- Aleksander Augezdecky

== B ==
- Karol Bahrke
- Jan Nepomucen de Bobrowicz

== C ==
- Mirosław Chojecki

== G ==
- Jan Grodek

== H ==
- Jan Haller

== K ==
- Marcin Kasprzak

== L ==
- Jarosław Leitgeber

== M ==
- Hieronim Malecki

== O ==
- Samuel Orgelbrand

== S ==
- Jan Seklucjan
- Walenty Stefański
- Kasper Straube

== U ==
- Florian Ungler

== W ==
- Hieronim Wietor
- Maciej Wirzbięta
