= History of printing in Poland =

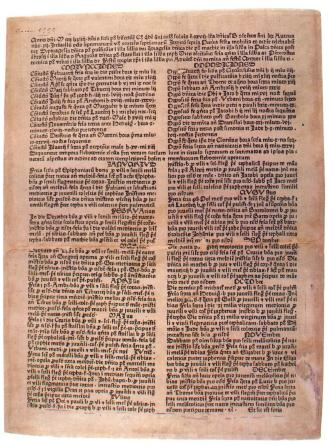
Sole surviving copy of the Almanach cracoviense ad annum 1474

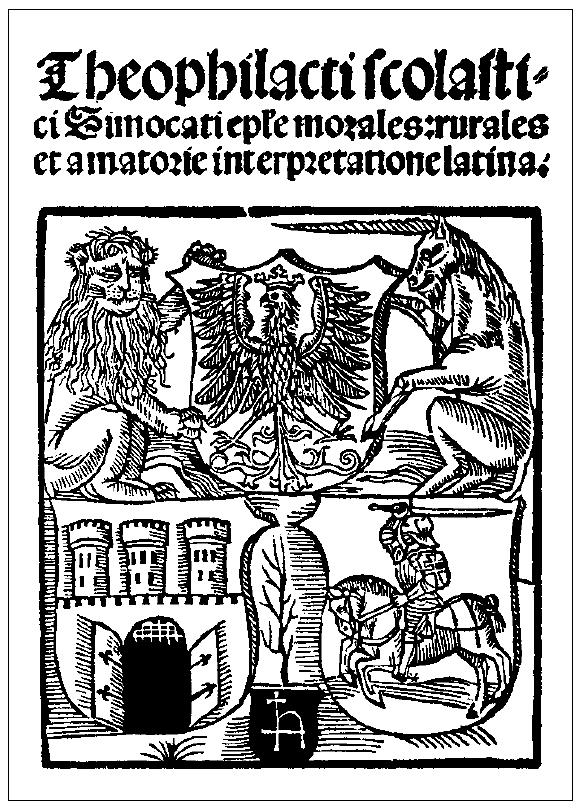
Copernicus' translation into Latin of Greek poems by Theophylact Simocatta, printed by Johann Haller, 1509

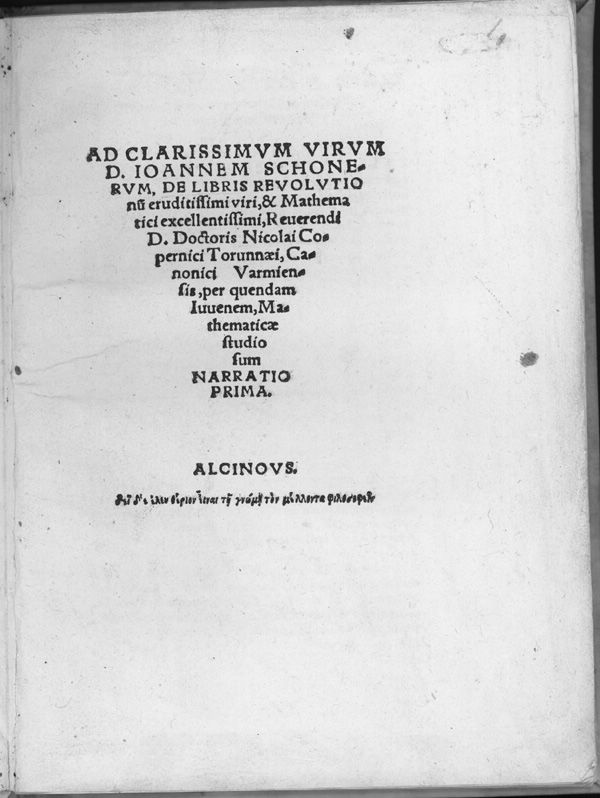
The Narratio prima of Rheticus, an abstract of Copernicus' heliocentric theory, printed 1540 in Danzig by Franz Rhode

The history of printing in Poland began in the late 15th century, when following the creation of the Gutenberg Bible in 1455, printers from Western Europe spread the new craft abroad.

The Polish capital at the time was in Kraków, where scholars, artists and merchants from Western Europe had already been present. Other cities which were part of the Polish kingdom followed later. Cities of northern Polish province of Royal Prussia, like the Hanseatic League city of Danzig (Gdańsk), had established printing houses early on.

The first printing shop was possibly opened in Kraków by Augsburg-based Günther Zainer in 1465. In 1491, Schweipolt Fiol printed the first book in Cyrillic script.

The next recorded printing shop was a Dutch one known by the name Typographus Sermonum Papae Leonis I. that might have been established in 1473 on Polish territory, but its exact location has yet to be determined.

The oldest known print from Poland is considered to be the Almanach cracoviense ad annum 1474 (Cracovian Almanac for the Year 1474) which is a single-sheet astronomical wall calendar for the year 1474 printed and published in 1473 by Kasper Straube. The only surviving copy of Almanach cracoviense measures 37 cm by 26.2 cm, and is in the collections of the Jagiellonian University.

The first text in Polish was printed in Breslau (Wrocław) in 1475. The first book printed in Polish was Historyja umęczenia Pana naszego Jezusa Chrystusa ("The story of the martyrdom of our Lord Jesus Christ"), published in 1508 by Johann Haller's publishing house. For a long time, the first print written in Polish was believed to be Hortulus Animae polonice, a Polish version of Hortulus Animae written by Biernat of Lublin, printed and published in 1513 by Florian Ungler in Kraków. The last known copy was lost during World War II.

One of the first commercial printers in Poland is considered to be Johann Haller who worked in Kraków in the early 16th century, starting in 1505, and who in 1509 printed a Latin translation by Nicolaus Copernicus of Greek poems by Theophylact Simocatta, Theophilacti Scolastici Simocatti Epistole morales, rurales at amatoriae, interpretatione latina.

Other well known early printers in Poland are:

- Hieronymus Vietor from Silesia who worked in Vienna and Kraków
- Printers from the Scharffenberg family
- Florian Ungler

In the late 16th century there were seven printing shops in Kraków, and in 1610 ten. A decline started in around 1615. Due to this fact in 1650 there remained only three secular printing shops, accompanied by a few ecclesiastical ones.

Only one printing shop is recorded in Warsaw in 1707, owned by the Piarists. This situation improved during the realm of the last Polish king, Stanisław August Poniatowski, that marked political and cultural revival in Poland. Unfortunately his attempts to reform the state led to the Partitions of Poland carried out by Prussia, Austria and Russia.

== See also ==
- Global spread of the printing press
- History of printing
- Book of Henryków containing the oldest sentence written in Polish
- Almanach cracoviense ad annum 1474
- Kasper Straube, Bavarian 15th-century printer active in Krakow
- Johann Haller, Franconian printer active in 16th-century Krakow
- Florian Ungler, Bavarian printer active in 16th-century Krakow
- Łazarz Andrysowicz (died 1577), Polish Renaissance printer

== Select bibliography ==
- "The Early Printed Book in Poland (15th-17th century)", eds. Janusz S. Gruchała, Michał Czerenkiewicz, Kraków: Avalon, 2023
