= Josephus Struthius =

Polish physician (1510–1568/1569)

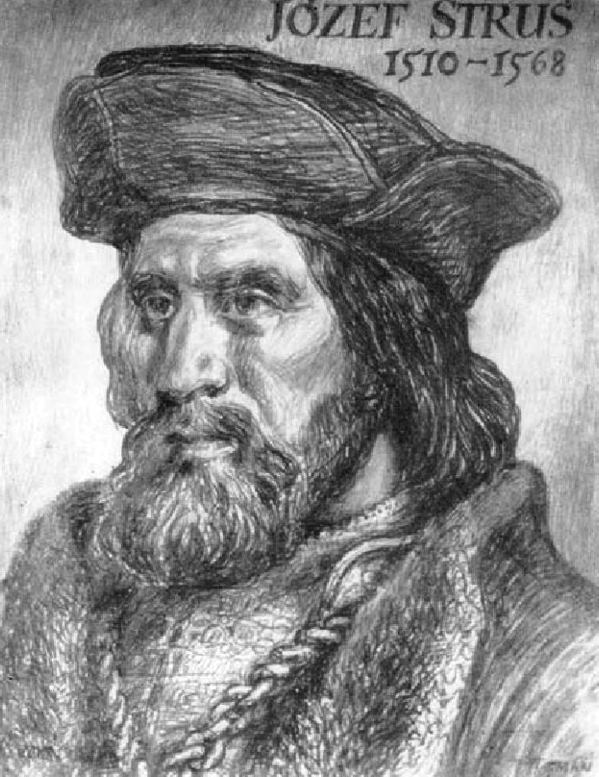
Engraving by Antoni Oleszczyński

Josephus Struthius (Polish: Józef Struś; 1510, Poznań – between 27 July 1568 and 26 January 1569, Poznań) was a Polish professor of medicine at Padua University (1535–1537) and personal physician for Polish kings. He also served as mayor of Poznań in 1557–1558 and 1558–1559. He wrote several books and was among the first to provide a visual representation of the human pulse and use it for diagnostic purposes.

== Biography ==
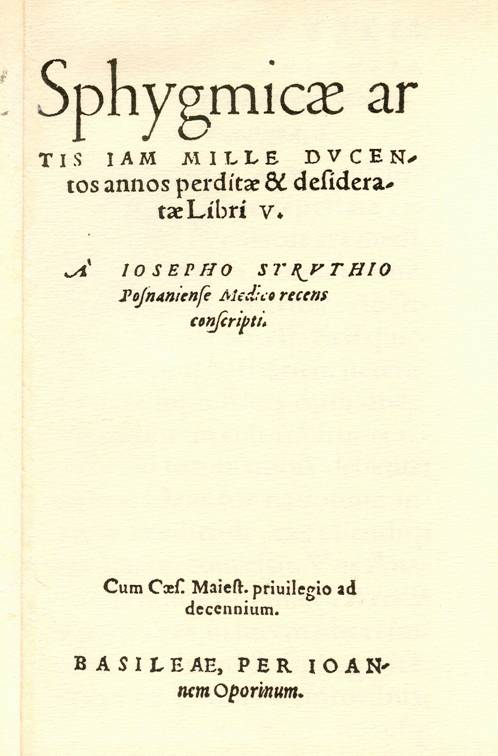
Title page of Joseph Struthius's treatise Sphygmicae artis iam mille ducentos perditae et desideratae libri V

Struś was born to a maltmaker Mikołaj and Elżbieta, a daughter of the Mayor of Poznań. He was educated at the local school associated with the church of St. Mary Magdalene and then studied at the Collegium Lubranscianum before joining the Jagiellonian University. He was influenced by the German reformer Christopher Hegendorf (1500–1540) at the Collegium Lubrascianum. He studied at the faculty of philosophy for two years and then moved to the faculty of medicine in 1527. He continued studies and obtained a master's degree in 1531. He wrote on the astrology of Luciani Samosatensis. In 1532 he went to study medicine in Padua where he started examining the works of Galen and Hippocrates, translating their works from Greek to Latin. After receiving a doctoral degree in 1535 he joined the Padua University faculty. He taught numerous students and influenced Andreas Vesalius among them. In 1537 he moved to Poland and became a physician to Andrzej Górka. His treatment of Isabella Jagiellon, daughter of King Sigismund I the Old (1467–1548) brought him recognition. He was part of a delegation to Constantinople, where he treated the Turkish Suleiman the Magnificent (1494–1566) who was suffering from a chronic illness. His popularity in Padua led to his becoming mayor in 1557 and in 1558. He died at Poznań in 1568 during a plague epidemic and was buried in the Church of St. Mary Magdalene.

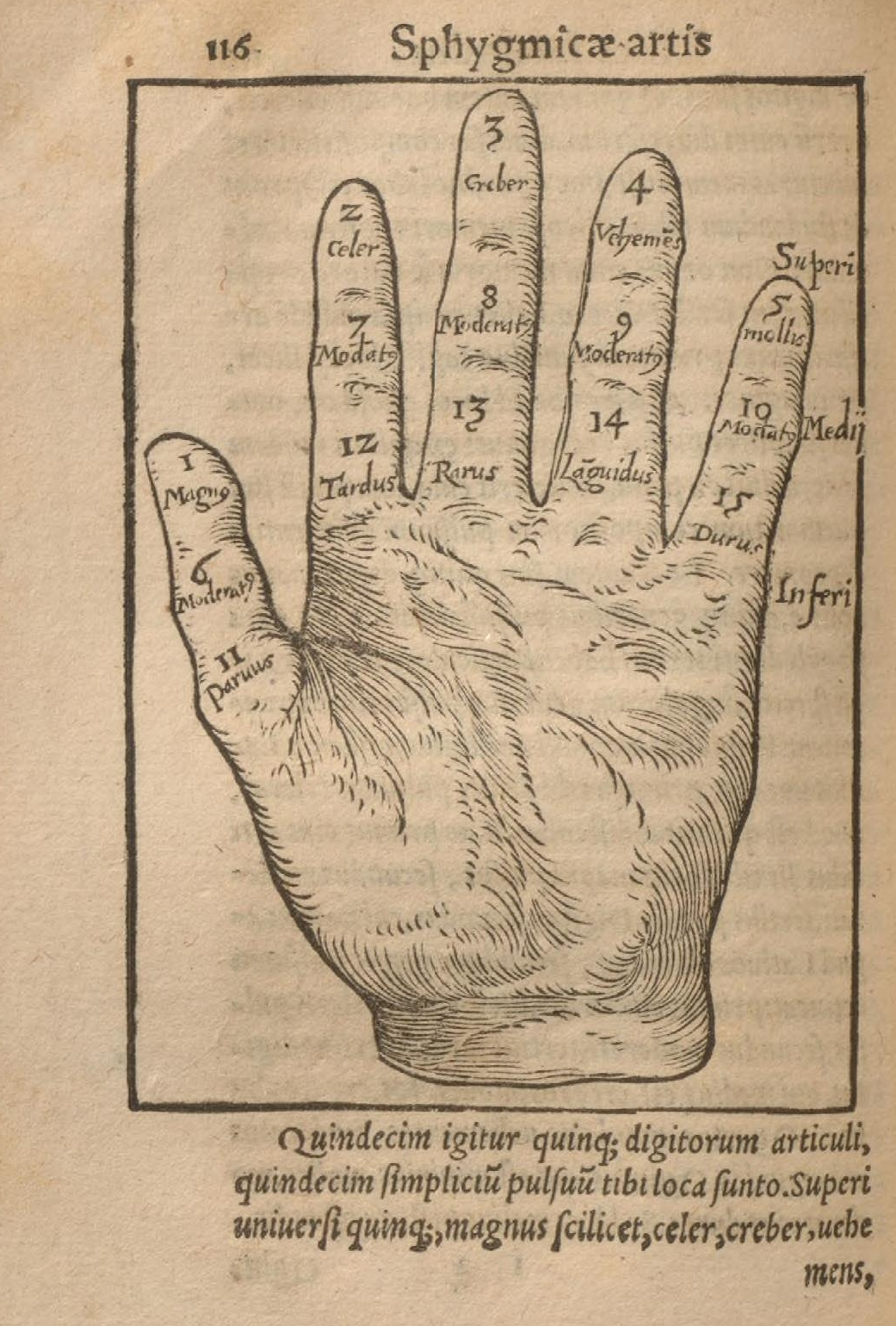
A memory device for understanding pulse introduced by Struthius

His conceptual approach to measurement of the pulse is regarded as pioneering and revolutionary. In Sphygmicae artis iam mille ducentos annos perditae et desideratae libri V. (first published 1540 in Basel, but only copies from 1555 are accessible) he described five types of pulses, the diagnostic meaning of those types, and the influence of body temperature and nervous system on pulse. As a memory aid he used the palm and fingers to the types of pulse. It contains probably the earliest graphic presentation of the pulse, making use of musical notes for long, breve, and semibreve. He also noted that the pulse could be used to detect lies and reactions of people. This was one of books used by William Harvey in his works.

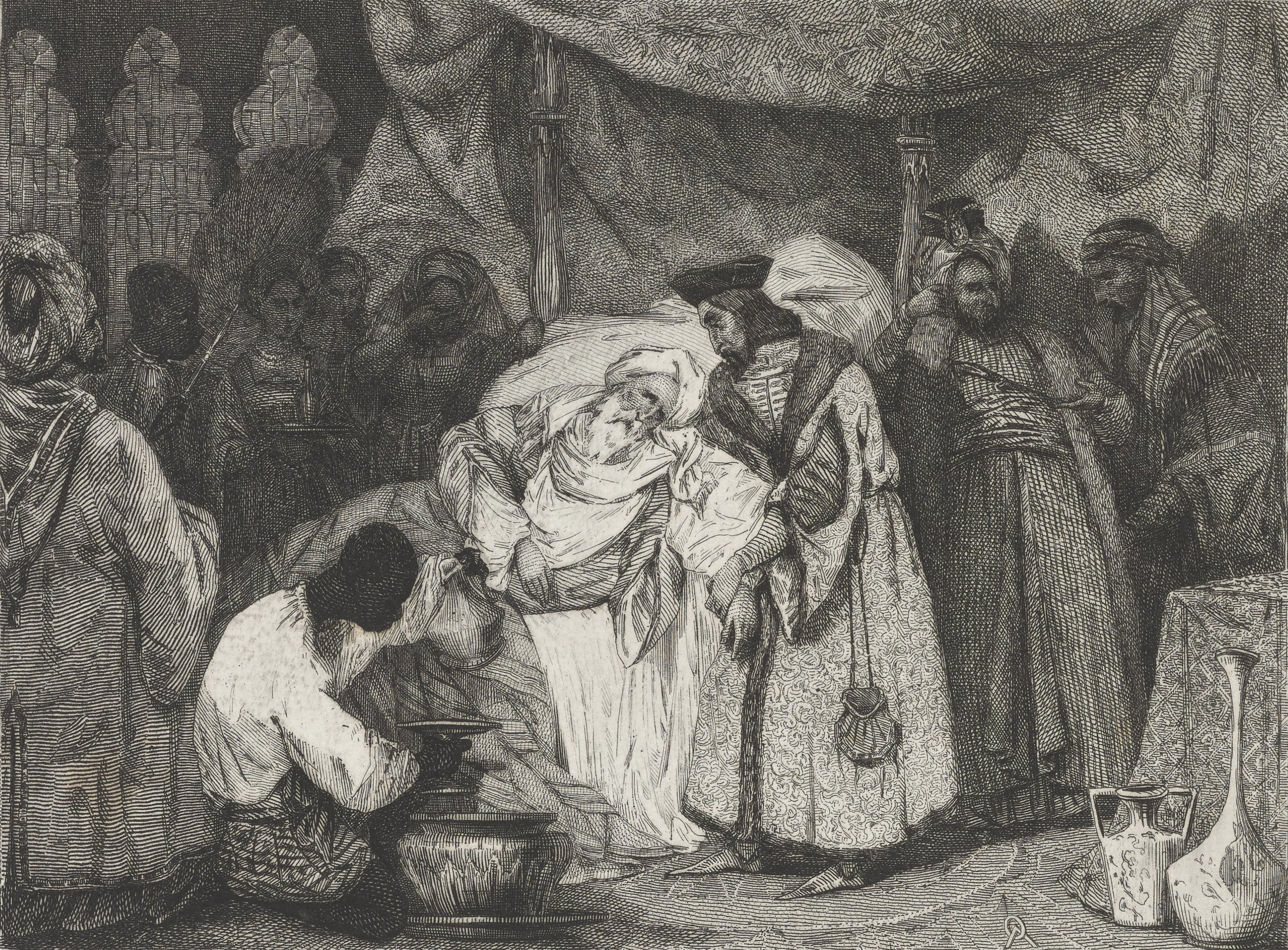
Struś treating Suleiman the Magnificent

Robert Burton wrote of Josephus Struthius in The Anatomy of Melancholy: "Josephus Struthius, that Polonian, in the fifth book, _cap. 17._ of his Doctrine of Pulses, holds that [...] passions of the mind may be discovered by the pulse."

In his book he introduced a set of rules about pulse to be remembered using the fingers as illustrated. Each finger had three degrees of intensity the thumb was for amplitude, the index for duration of systolic pulse, the middle finger for the frequency of the pulse, the fourth for pulse wave velocity, and the little finger for the tension of the pulse.

== Works ==
=== As author ===
- Ad medicum... D. Cyprianum de Łowicz, de medicae artis excellentia, carmen elegiacum. Kraków: M. Szarffenberg, 1529.
- Ad Joannem Latalscium... elegia, wyd. w: K. Hegendorfin Declamatio gratulatoria, Kraków: drukarnia Wietora 1530.
- Ad bonae mentis adoloscentes elegiacum carmen paraeneticum i. e. exhortativum ad studium eloquentiae. In K. Hegendorfin, Declamatio gratulatoria. Kraków: drukarnia H. Wietor, 1530.
- Sanctissimi Patris... Joannis a Lasco... epicedion elegiacis versibus confectum. Kraków: drukarnia M. Szarffenberg, 1531.
- Sphygmicae artis... libri V. Bazylea: Johannes Oporinus, 1555.
  - Later editions: As Artis sphygmicae... libri quinque, Wenecja, 1573; as Ars sphygmica seu pulsum doctrina..., Bazylea, 1602; partial Polish translation in Wybór tekstów do dziejów kultury Wielkopolski, Poznań, 1962.
- Opera medica, scil. de ortu et causis metallorum, de medicamentorum spagyrica praeparatione, sclopetarius et antidotarium spagyriticum. Frankfurt nad Odrą, 1591.

=== As translator ===
- Lucian. Declamatio quaedam lepidissima, printed with Lucian. Astrologia.... Kraków: M. Szarffenberg, 1531.
- C. Galenus. Astrologia. Venice: J. Patavinus i V. de Ruffinellis, 1535.
- C. Galenus. De urinis liber. Venice: J. Patavinus and V. de Ruffinellis, 1535.
- C. Galenus. Antidotarius. Venice: J. A. de Nicolinis de Sabio, 1536.
- C. Galenus. De antidotis. Venice: J. A. de Nicolinis de Sabio, 1537,
- C. Galenus. Librum Hippocratis de fracturis commentariorum libri tres. Venice: B. Zanettus, 1538.

=== As editor ===
- C. Galenus. De differentiis morborum liber. Kraków: H. Wietor, 1537. Translated from Greek to Latin by G. Copus.

== See also ==
- Michał Boym
