= Anselmus Ephorinus =

Silesian humanist and doctor (c. 1505–1566)

Anselmus Ephorinus (Anzelm Eforyn, Eforinus; c. 1505 – December 1566) was a Silesian humanist and doctor.

== Life ==
Born in Mirsk (German: Friedeberg), Ephorinus enrolled at the Kraków Academy in 1515, earning a baccalarius in 1522 and a magister in 1527. He briefly lectured there on dialectics and logic. He also worked as a tutor and counted a young Jan Boner and the son of Justus Ludwik Decjusz among his pupils. With the former, Ephorinus travelled widely, stopping in Erfurt and Nuremberg, reaching Freiburg in 1531. There, Ephorinus stayed with Erasmus for some months. He studied medicine in Padua, earning a medical doctorate on 11 April 1534.

Ephorinus returned to Kraków in autumn 1537. On his return to Kraków, he was appointed as the first town doctor, and not long thereafter the king appointed him physician to the Wieliczka salt mine. In Kraków, Ephorinus was part of the Erasmian circle of Leonard Cox. Franciszek Mymer wrote a poem, titled "In salvum reditum Anselmi Ephoryni..." (1538) celebrating Ephorinus' return to Poland.

He corresponded with Erasmus. Ephorinus is now considered an early advocate of a distinct Silesian identity. In their correspondence Erasmus frequently referred to Ephorinus as a Pole. To put this to rest, Ephorinus signed a letter: Tuus et suus, Anselmus Ephorinus, Silesius non Polonus (Your and my own, Anselmus Ephorinus, a Silesian, not a Pole).

Anselmus Ephorinus died in 1566. He is buried in Kraków.

== Works ==
- (as editor) Heyden, Sebastian. Puerilium colloquiorum formulae. Kraków: Hieronymus Vietor, 1527.
- Medicinale compendium. Kraków: Hieronymus Vietor, 1542.
