= Ungler =

Ungler is a surname. Notable people with the surname include:

- Florian Ungler (died 1536), German printer
- Helena Ungler (died 1551), Polish printer
