= Scharffenberg =

Scharffenberg is a surname. Notable people with the surname include:

- Johan Scharffenberg (1869–1965), Norwegian activist
- Mimi Scharffenberg, American missionary
- Svein Scharffenberg, Norwegian actor and stage director
- Scharffenberg family, Polish family of printers and bookdealers
