= Maciej Wirzbięta =

Polish printer and translator

Maciej Wirzbięta (alternatively Wierzbięta; (b. 1523 Kraków, d. June 1605) – Polish printer, translator and bookseller based Kraków. He printed the works of Mikołaj Rej, Jan Kochanowski, Łukasz Górnicki, and Andrzej Frycz Modrzewski, among others.

== Biography ==
Maciej Wirzbięta was born in 1523 to a Kraków burgher family. He most likely learned the art of printing from Florian Ungler, whose printing office he managed for his wife Helena Ungler after Florian's death in 1536. In 1544 he acquired a house with a printing office near Sławkowska Street and outfitted the office with equipment bought from the widow of the Bernard Wojewodka, printer of the Brest Bible. It's possible that there was a connection between the death in 1554 of Jakub Przyłuski and Wirzbięta establishing his printing office. Wirzbięta converted from Catholicism to Calvinism and subsequently printed predominantly Protestant works.

Twice married, he died in June 1605.

== Works ==
He printed the majority of the works of Mikołaj Rej, as well as Jan Kochanowski's Szachy (Chess), Łukasz Górnicki's Dworzanin polski (an adaptation of Baldassare Castiglione's Book of the Courtier), and works by Andrzej Frycz Modrzewski. He printed theological works, polemics, confessions, and other religious works. He also published a significant amount of music notation, mostly Protestant solo songbooks, using a combination of type and woodblock.

The final dated work printed by Maciej printshop appeared in 1609, and his son, Paweł, took over the shop a year later in 1610.

Other works printed by Maciej Wirzbięta include:

- Agrippa, Heinrich Cornelius. O ślachetności a zacności płci niewieściej. Kraków, 1575.
- Tebańczyk, Cebes. Tablica albo Konterfet Cebesa tebańskiego filozofa. Kraków, 1581.

== Bibliography ==
- Frantz, Wiktor. W gnieździe drukarstwa polskiego. Kraków: Wydawnictwo Literackie, 1974.
- Ptaśnik, J. "Cracovia impressorum XV et XVI ss." Monumenta Poloniae Typographica XV et XVI Saeculorum, vol. 1. Lwów, 1922.
- Encyklopedia wiedzy o książce. Wrocław, Warszawa, Kraków: Zakład Narodowy im. Ossolińskich, 1971.
- Bibliografia Literatury Polskiej – Nowy Korbut, vol. 3 Piśmiennictwo Staropolskie, pp. 395–6. Warsaw: Państwowy Instytut Wydawniczy, 1965.
