= Sodalitas =

Sodalitas is a Latin word meaning "association, fraternity." It may refer to:

- a fraternal order of priests or similar association in ancient Rome; see Glossary of ancient Roman religion#sodalitas
- Sodality
- Sodality (Catholic Church)
- Sodalitas Litterarum Vistulana, sodality from the 15th century

== See also ==
- Sodales Augustales, a priesthood in ancient Rome
- Confraternity
