= Anton Schneeberger =

Swiss botanist (1530–1581)

Anton Schneeberger (1530 – 13 March 1581) was a Swiss botanist and doctor based in Poland.

== Life ==
Schneeberger was born in 1530 in Zürich. He began his studies at Basel under the doctor of natural scientist Conrad Gessner. He later studied at Basel, before arriving at the Jagiellonian University in Kraków in 1553. Three years later he left for France, studying at Montpellier and Paris, where he earned the title of doctor of medicine and philosophy.

In 1559 Schneeberger returned to Poland. He kept an active travel schedule, however, visiting Lithuania and spending time at the university in Königsberg. He returned to Kraków in 1561 and soon established himself among the local doctors and scholars. He counted Copernicus' student Georg Joachim Rheticus and the German doctor and book collector Matthias Stoius among his friends. Schneeberger also became a book collector.

Schneeberg married twice. His first wife, Katarzyna, daughter of the royal doctor Jan Antonin, died young in 1569. His second wife, Anna, was the daughter of the wealthy apothecary Mikołaj Alantsee. They had one son together, named Anton, who later became a doctor himself. The younger Anton studied in Padua, but died relatively young.

== Works ==
- Catalogus stirpium latine et polonine conscriptus. Kraków: drukarnia Łazarzowa, 1557.
  - One of the first works about the flora local to the region of Kraków.
- Catalogus medicamentorum simplicium sive evporiston pestilentiae ueneno aduersatium. Zürich: Gesner, 1561. Digitzed by Bayerische Staatsbibliothek.
- De multiplici salis usu libellus. Kraków: Łazarz Andrysowicz, 1562. Digitized by Dolnośląska Biblioteka Cyfrowa.
- De bona militum valetudine conservanda liber. Księga o zachowaniu dobrego zdrowia żołnierzy. Kraków: drukarnia Łazarzowa, 1564. Reprinted with additional material, Warsaw, 2008. Digitized by Bayerische Staatsbibliothek.
- Medicamentorum facile parabilium adversus omnis generis articulorum dolores enumeratio. Frankfurt: Andreas Wechelus, 1580. Digitized by Bayerische Staatsbibliothek.

== See also ==
- Simon Syrenius, Zielnik
