= Erhard Schön =

German artist (c. 1491–1542)

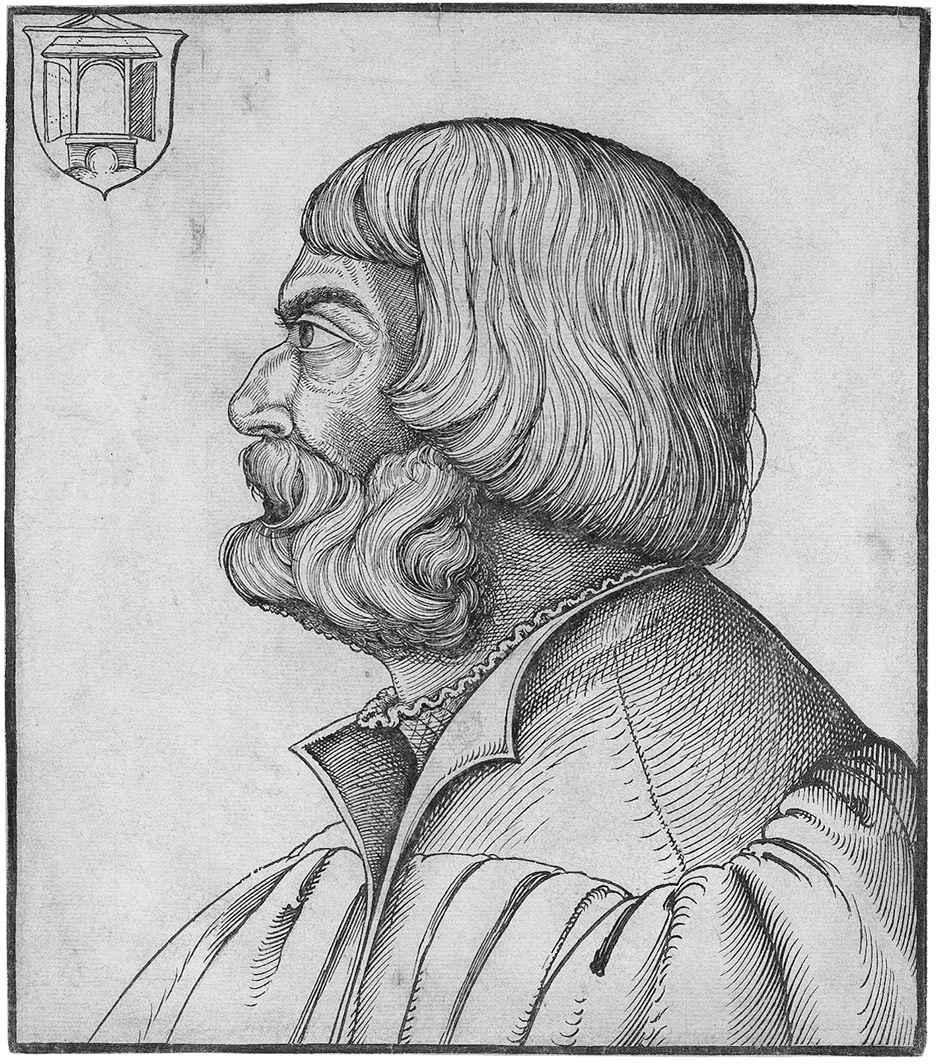
Erhard Schön, Portrait of Albrecht Dürer

Erhard Schön (c. 1491–1542) was a German woodcut designer and painter.

Schön was born in Nuremberg as the son of painter Max Schön III. He probably started to learn his trade as an artist in the workshop of his father. He was clearly influenced by the printmaking of Albrecht Dürer and may have contributed a few woodcuts to Dürer's Triumphal Arch (1515) and Theuerdank (1517). Especially Schön's way of modelling and placing figures is clearly derived from Dürer. After the death of Dürer, Schön also produced a woodcut portrait of the artist.

Such woodcut portraits was only one of the genres Schön worked in. He produced prints of various kind for the popular market and established himself as a popularly demanded artist. Around 1200 illustrations for 116 books in addition to 200 separate woodcuts have been attributed to Schön. His first known work is a series of woodcuts for a book, from 1513. Until 1524 he mainly illustrated religious books. Together with Hans Springinklee he provided illustrations of rather high quality for the popular prayer book Hortulus Animae in 1515. A Great Rosary form approximately the same time has been described as his finest religious work. From the 1520s he produced several polemical works criticising Catholicism and in favour of Lutheranism. From the mid-1520s and early 1530s these satirical works display an influence from Barthel Beham, Sebald Beham and Georg Pencz. At this time, he also expanded his repertoire from religious to secular subjects, still with a satirical tone. From the 1530s, he switched to Classical themes such as the Judgement of Paris and Laocoön. In 1538 Christoph Zell of Nuremberg published a treatise on proportion in art.
