= Kasper Straube =

German printer

Straube's printing seal, copied from that of the German printing company Fust & Schöffer. Straube replaced the original monogram with the initials of Jesus and Mary

Kasper Straube (also Kaspar or Caspar, also known as The Printer of the Turrecrematas) was a German 15th-century printer from Bavaria.

He was active in Kraków between 1473 and 1477, decades before Johann Haller. His Latin almanac Calendarium cracoviense (Cracovian Calendar) of 1473 is regarded as the first work printed in Poland.

Other surviving printed works by Straube include:

- Juan de Torquemada: Explanatio in Psalterium
- Franciscus de Platea: Opus restitutionum usurarum et excommunicationum
- Augustine of Hippo: Opuscula (de doctrina christiana, de praedestinatione sanctorum)

== See also ==
- History of printing in Poland
- Incunable
- Johannes Gutenberg
- Movable type
- Printing
- Global spread of the printing press
- Florian Ungler
