= Franciszek Mymer =

16th-century Polish poet

Franciszek Mymer (Leomontanus Silesius, Mymerus, Lewenbergus; b. c. 1500, Lwówek Śląski, d. after 1564) – translator, poet, and editor writing in Latin, Polish, and German, promoter of national languages and of education in Polish.

== Biography ==
Franciszek Mymer came from a family of burghers. He studied at the Kraków Academy in 1519-1531, earning the title of magister of the seven liberal arts. In 1531 he lectured there on Ovid's Tristia. He mostly likely lived and worked in Kraków until 1540 or 1542. He later worked as a city writer in Kościan, spent time in Toruń, and also served as a churchwarden in Dohna, near Dresden. He knew several languages: Czech, Italian, and Greek, in addition to German, Polish, and Latin.

His uncle was the Kraków printer, Marek Szarffenberg.

== Selected works ==
=== Own works ===
- Dictionarium trium linguarum: latinae, teutonicae etc. polonicae potiora vocabula continens. Kraków, in officina Maciej Scharffenberg, 1528, 1550; Kraków, Hieronim Wietor, 1541; Kaliningrad, Hans Daubmann, 1558, 1570; Kaliningrad, Georg Osterberg, 1592.
  - Possibly a re-edition of the Latin-German-Czech dictionary published by Hieronymus Vietor in 1513;
- Dobrego zdrowia rządzenie, przez wszystkie miesiące roczne, jako się każdy człowiek w yadle y w piciu y w puszczaniu krwie ma rządzić. 1528.
- In miserriam Joannis Mymeri germani fratris unici, in sylvis a praedonibus caedem, naenia funebris. Kraków: Maciej Scharffenberg, 1532.
  - A collection of poetry dedicated to his brother Jan, who was murdered by robbers in the forest between Warsaw and Piaseczno.

=== Works as editor or translator ===
Mymer translated many grammar and rhetoric textbooks from Latin. He also edited a number of ancient authors, occasionally in dual language editions, among them Seneca the Younger, Plautus, and Juvenal.

- Melanchthon, Philipp. Outline of Latin syntax. Kraków: drukarnia Macieja Scharffenberga, 1521;
- Petrus Mosellanus. Paedologia. Kraków: in aedibus Maciej Szarfenberg, sumpt. Marek Szarfenberg, 1527.
- Plautus. Amphitrio. Kraków: per Maciej Szarfenberg, 1530
- Martinus Bracarensis. Formula honestae vitae de quatuor virtutibus cardinalibus. Kraków: per Maciej Szarfenberg, ductu & impensa Marek Szarfenberg, 1532.
- Regimen sanitatis medicorum parisiensium... Kraków: Maciej Szarfenberg, 1532; Kraków: Stanisław Szarfenberg, 1575.
- Sulpitius Verulanus, Johannes. De moribus puerorum carmina: cum ruthmis Germanicis et Polonicis necnon glossemate latino illustratum. Kraków, Maciej Szarfenberg, 1533.
- Perotti, M. De componendis epistolis;
- Pseudo-Cato. Cathonis Disticha moralia...;
- Seneca. Formuale honestae vitae et rithmi german. ac. polonica linguis;
- Pseudo-Plutarch. Dicteria Laconica graece edita;
- Plautus. Cassina;
- Medicina metrica de regimine sanitatis...
  - A collection of rules for a good life.
