= Sodalitas Litterarum Vistulana =

Literary society of the 15th century

Sodalitas Litterarum Vistulana ("Literary Sodality of the Vistula") was an international academic society modelled after the Roman Academy, founded circa 1495 in Kraków by Conrad Celtes, a German humanist scholar who also founded the Sodalitas Literarum Hungarorum in Hungary and the Sodalitas Literarum Rhenana (of the Rhine) in Heidelberg. In 1494, the seat was transferred from Cracow to Vienna and the name was changed to Sodalitas Litterarum Danubiana (of the Danube).

Between 1497 and 1499, it was presided by the John Vitéz the Younger (died 1499) bishop of Vienna, nephew of John Vitéz.

Notable members, besides Celtes, were Johann Reuchlin, Johannes Trithemius, Jakob Wimpfeling, Conrad of Leonberg, Johannes Cuspinian, and Filippo Buonaccorsi, Laurentius Corvinus and Johann Sommerfeld the Elder (died 1501).
