= Learned society =

Social entity established to pursue a scholarly field or academic discipline

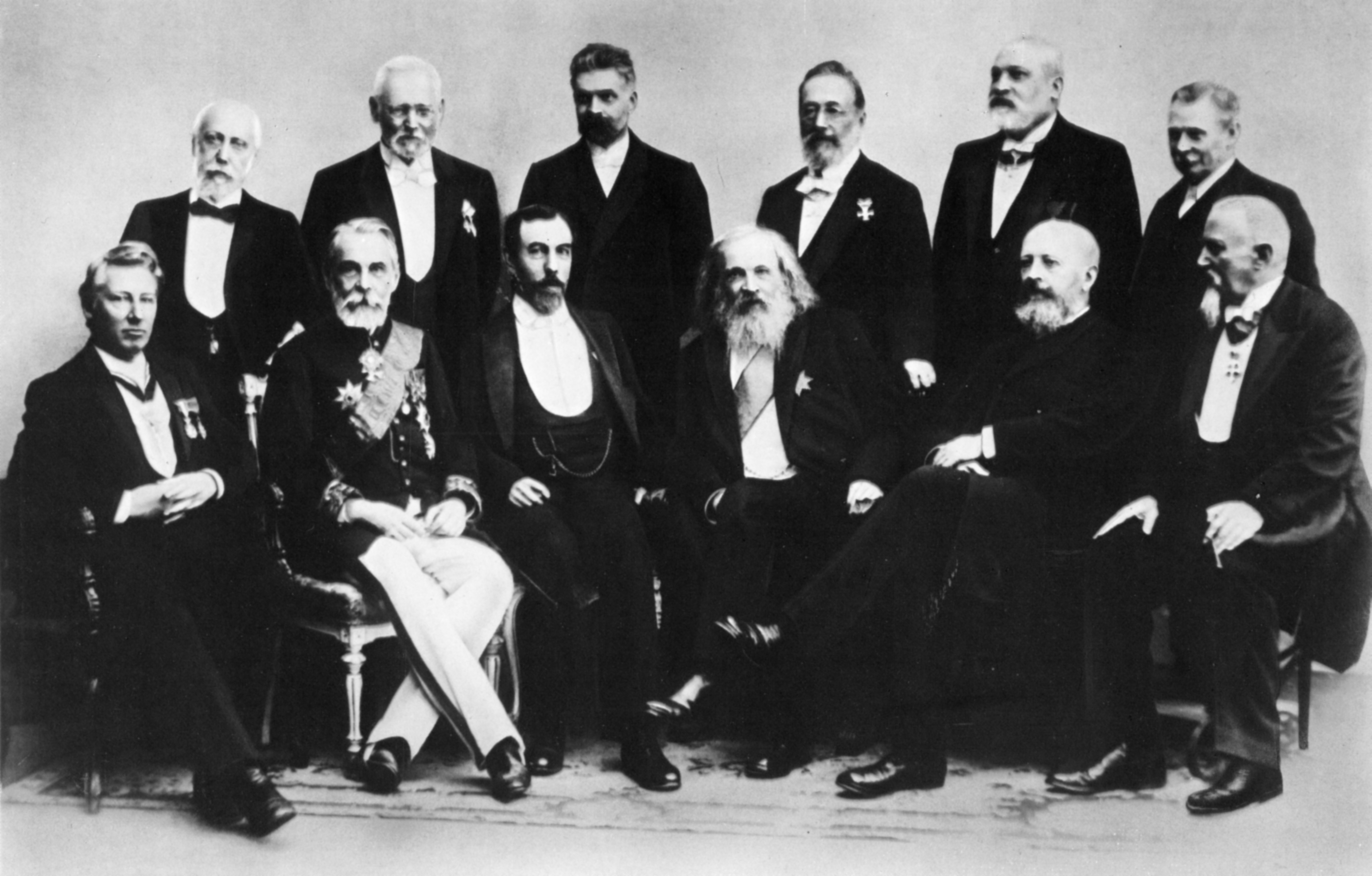
200th anniversary of Berlin Academy, 1900

A learned society (/ˈlɜːrnɪd/ LUR-nid; also scholarly, intellectual, or academic society) is an organization that exists to promote an academic discipline, profession, or a group of related disciplines such as the arts and sciences. Membership may be open to all, may require possession of some qualification, or may be an honour conferred by election.

Most learned societies are non-profit organizations, and many are professional associations. Their activities typically include holding regular conferences for the presentation and discussion of new research results, and publishing or sponsoring academic journals in their discipline. Some also act as professional bodies, regulating the activities of their members in the public interest or the collective interest of the membership.

== History ==
Some of the oldest learned societies are the Académie des Jeux floraux (founded 1323), Sodalitas Litterarum Vistulana (founded 1488), Accademia della Crusca (founded 1583), Accademia dei Lincei (founded 1603), Académie Française (founded 1635), German National Academy of Sciences Leopoldina (founded 1652), Royal Society (founded 1660) and French Academy of Sciences (founded 1666).

== Significance ==
Scholars in the sociology of science argue that learned societies are of key importance and their formation assists in the emergence and development of new disciplines or professions. In the form of professional associations, they can assist in the creation of pathways to leadership.

== Structure ==
Societies can be very general in nature, such as the American Association for the Advancement of Science, specific to a given discipline, such as the Modern Language Association, or specific to a given area of study, such as the Royal Entomological Society.

Most are either specific to a particular country (e.g. the Chinese Academy of Sciences), though they generally include some members from other countries as well, often with local branches, or are international, such as the International Federation of Library Associations and Institutions or the Regional Studies Association, in which case they often have national branches. But many are local, such as the Massachusetts Medical Society, the publishers of the internationally known The New England Journal of Medicine.

Some learned societies (such as the Royal Society Te Apārangi) have been rechartered by legislation to form quasi-autonomous non-governmental organizations.

== Membership and fellowship ==
Membership may be open to all, may require possession of some qualification, or may be an honor conferred by election.

Some societies offer membership to those who have an interest in a particular subject or discipline, provided they pay their membership fees. Older and more academic/professional societies may offer associateships and/or fellowships to fellows who are appropriately qualified by honoris causa, or by submission of a portfolio of work or an original thesis. A benefit of membership may be discounts on the subscription rates for the publications of the society. Many of these societies award post-nominal letters to their memberships.

== Online academic communities ==
Following the globalization and the development of information technology, certain scholarly societies—such as the Modern Language Association—have created virtual communities for their members. In addition to established academic associations, academic virtual communities have been so organized that, in some cases, they have become more important platforms for interaction and scientific collaborations among researchers and faculty than have traditional scholarly societies. Members of these online academic communities, grouped by areas of interests, use for their communication shared and dedicated listservs (for example JISCMail), social networking services (like Facebook or LinkedIn) and academic oriented social networks (like Humanities Commons, ResearchGate, Mendeley or Academia.edu).

== See also ==
- Academic conferences
- List of learned societies
- National academy
- Professional association
- Text publication society
