= Hortulus Animae =

15th to 16th century prayer book

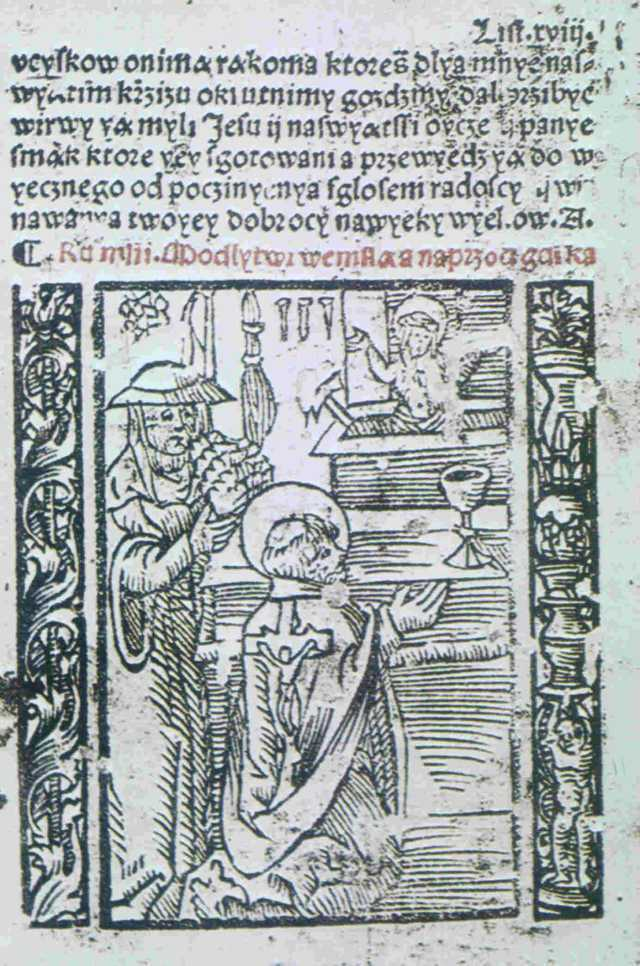
Page from Hortulus Animae polonice

Hortulus Animae (English: Little Garden of the Soul, German: Seelengärtlein, French: Jardin des Âmes, Polish: Raj duszny) was the Latin title of a prayer book also available in German. It was very popular in the early sixteenth century, printed in many versions, also abroad in Lyons and Kraków.

== History ==
An earlier well-known work of devotion and of moral instruction, richly illustrated with stories, was "Der Selen Würtzgart", first printed at Ulm in 1483. The meaning of the title is "Herb garden of the Soul", which is similar to later titles.

The first known edition of Hortulus Animae, dated 13 March 1498, was printed at Strasbourg by Wilhelm Schaffener of Ribeauvillé (Rappschwihr), followed by German versions appearing in 1501. Later editions contained woodcuts by the well-known engravers Hans Springinklee and Erhard Schön, with beautiful miniatures in some existing manuscript examples, like the one at Vienna (Cod. Bibl. Pal. Vindobonensis. 2706, 1907), which has been reproduced as facsimile by Friedrich Dornhöffer. In 1501/1502, Sebastian Brant from Strasbourg translated it into German.

Hortulus Animae polonice, a Polish version written by Biernat of Lublin, printed and published in 1513 by Florian Ungler in Kraków, was the second book printed in the Polish language (after Historyja umęczenia Pana naszego Jezusa Chrystusa in 1508). The last known copy was lost during World War II.

The work is mentioned briefly at the end of Edgar Allan Poe's short story "The Man of the Crowd."

== See also ==
- Book of Henryków
- Almanach cracoviense ad annum 1474
- History of printing in Poland
