= Conrad Celtes =

German Renaissance humanist scholar and poet (1459–1508)

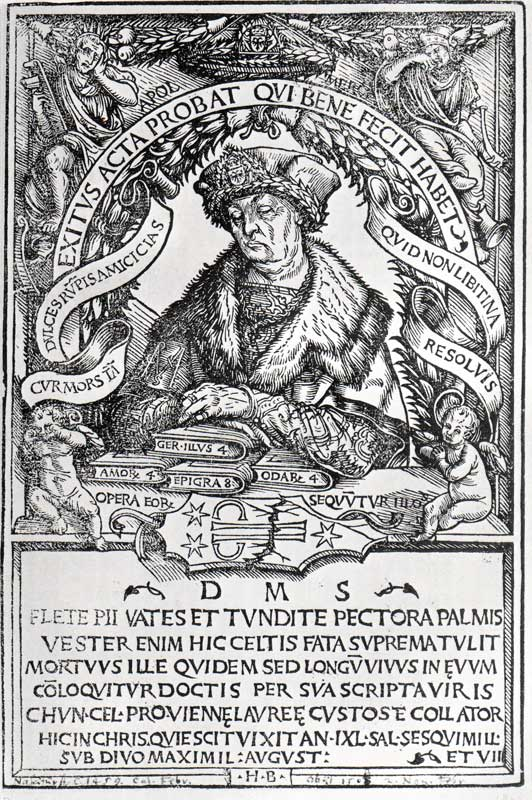
- Epitaph of Conrad Celtes, woodcut by Hans Burgkmair, 1507
- Born: 1 February 1459; Wipfeld (present-day Lower Franconia)
- Died: 4 February 1508 (aged 49); Vienna, Archduchy of Austria
- Other name: Conradus Celtis Protucius
- Education: University of Cologne (B.A., 1479); University of Heidelberg (M.A., 1485); Jagiellonian University
- Scientific career
- Fields: History
- Workplaces: University of Ingolstadt; University of Vienna

Conrad Celtes (German: Konrad Celtes; Latin: Conradus Celtis (Protucius); 1 February 1459 – 4 February 1508) was a German Renaissance humanist scholar and poet of the German Renaissance born in Franconia (nowadays part of Bavaria). He led the theatrical performances at the Viennese court and reformed the syllabi.

Celtis is considered by many to be the greatest of German humanists and thus dubbed "the Archhumanist" (Erzhumanist). He is also praised as "the greatest lyric genius and certainly the greatest organizer and popularizer of German Humanism". (Note: "Conrad Celtis, der deutsche Erzhumanist, perhaps the greatest lyric genius and certainly the greatest organizer and popularizer of German Humanism, has fared somewhat better than most of his NeoLatin contemporaries.")

== Life ==
Born at Wipfeld, near Schweinfurt (present-day Lower Franconia) under his original name Konrad Bickel or Pyckell (modern spelling Pickel), Celtes left home to avoid being set to his father's trade of vintner, and pursued his studies at the University of Cologne (1477–1479; B.A., 1479) and at the University of Heidelberg (M.A., 1485). While at Heidelberg, he received patronage and instruction from Dalberg and Agricola. As customary in those days for humanists, he Latinized his name, to Conradus Celtis. For some time he delivered humanist lectures during his travels to Erfurt, Rostock and Leipzig. His first work was titled Ars versificandi et carminum (The Art of Writing Verses and Poems, 1486). He further undertook lecture tours to Rome, Florence, Bologna and Venice.

The elector Frederick of Saxony approached the emperor Frederick III, who named Conrad Celtes Poet Laureate (Honored Poet) upon his return. At this great imperial ceremonial gathering in Nuremberg, Celtes was at the same time presented with a doctoral degree. Celtes again made a lecturing tour throughout the empire.

In 1489–1491, he stayed in Kraków where he studied mathematics, astronomy and the natural sciences at the Jagiellonian University (at which he enrolled in 1489), and befriended many other humanists such as Lorenz Rabe and Bonacursius. He also founded a learned society, based on the Roman academies. The local branch of the society was called Sodalitas Litterarum Vistulana (the "Literary Society on the Vistula River").

In 1490 he once again went through Breslau (Wrocław) to Prague, capital of the Kingdom of Bohemia. Hartmann Schedel used Celtis' descriptions of Breslau in the Schedelsche Weltchronik (Nuremberg Chronicle). In Hungary, Celtis formed the Sodalitas Litterarum Hungaria ("Hungarian Literary Society"), later as Sodalitas Litterarum Danubiana to be based in Vienna. He made stops at Regensburg, Passau and Nuremberg (and probably Mainz). At Heidelberg he founded the Sodalitas Litterarum Rhenana ("Rhineland Literary Society"). Later he went to Lübeck and Ingolstadt. At Ingolstadt, in 1492, he delivered his famous speech to the students there, in which he called on Germans to rival Italians in learning and letters. This would later become an extremely popular address in sixteenth-century German nationalistic sentiment.

In 1494, Celtes rediscovered Hrosvitha's works written in Latin in the monastery of St. Emmeram in Regensburg. His friend Willibald Pickheimer introduce him to Abbess Caritas Pickheimer. He wrote her in Latin and called her the "new Hrotsvitha".

While the plague ravaged Ingolstadt, Celtes taught at Heidelberg. By now he was a professor. In 1497 Celtes was called to Vienna by the emperor Maximilian I, who honored him as teacher of the art of poetry and conversation with an imperial Privilegium, the first of its kind. There he lectured on the works of classical writers and in 1502 founded the Collegium Poetarum, a college for poets. His invitation to Vienna came about greatly at the influence of his friend and fellow scholar Johannes Cuspinian.

Celtes died in Vienna a few years later of syphilis.

According to Richard Unger, Celtes was a large scale book thief who walked around episcopal palaces and monastic libraries stealing books for his emperor and himself. He justified his behaviours on the basis of patriotic intentions, claiming that he only wanted to protect German patrimony from "damaging weather, dust, mold... insects", as well as Italians. Emily Albu writes that Celtis, Peutinger and their emperor took particular interest in cultural legacies that could provide connection between their German Roman Empire and the ancient Roman imperium. In the case of the Peutinger map (mentioned below), both Celtis and Peutinger made sure that any record of where Celtis found it as well as clues to the map's first three centuries were erased.

== Works ==
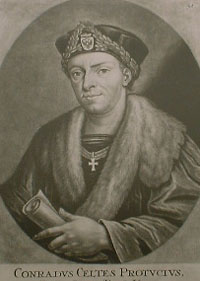
Conradus Celtis

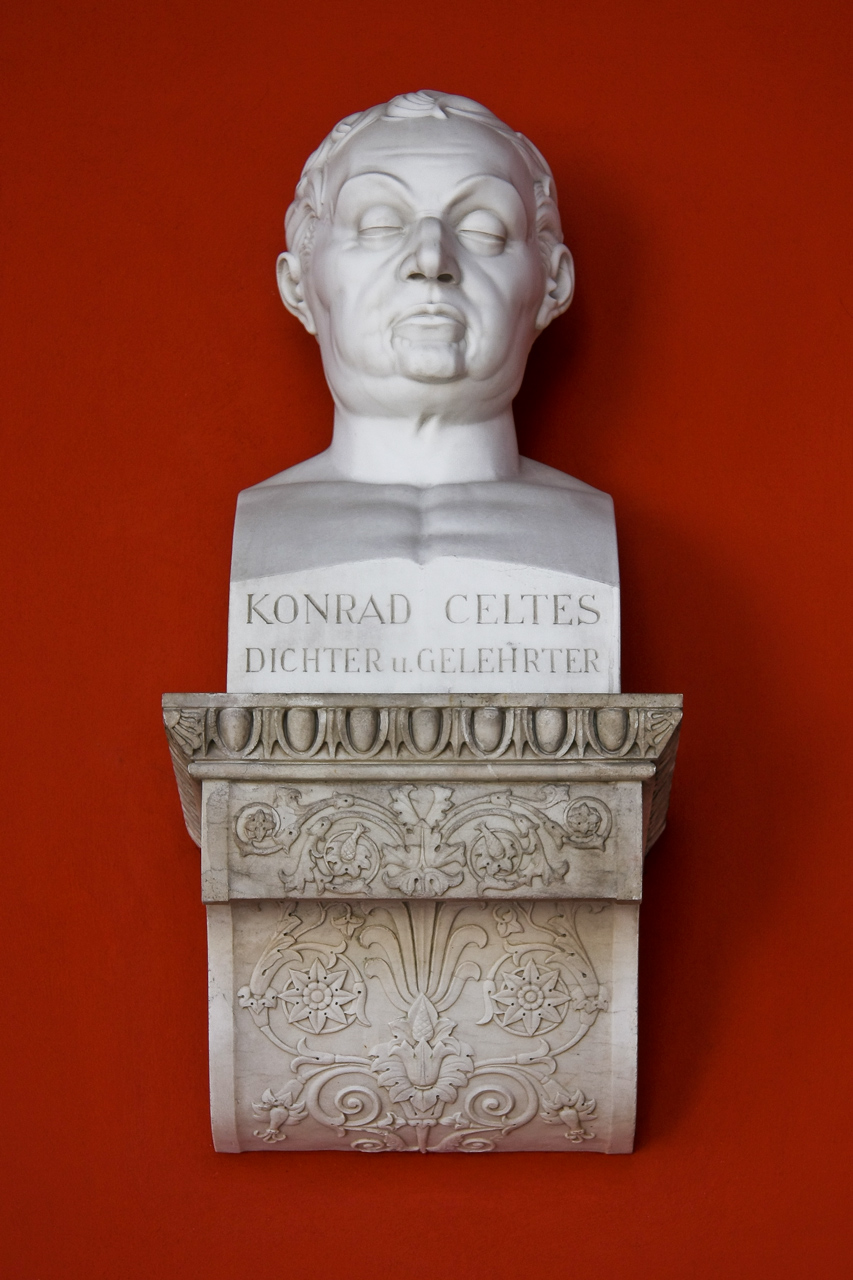
Bust in the Ruhmeshalle, Munich

Conrad Celtes' teachings had lasting effects, particularly in the fields of classical languages and history. He brought systematic methods to the teaching of Latin and furthered the study of the classics. He was also the first to teach the history of the world as a whole. Celtes was the first early modern humanist who introduced the term "topography" as a critical appraisal of the Ptolemaic dichotomy between cosmography and chorography, which was becoming insufficient to reflect the rapidly changing contours of Europe.

He was the foremost cartographic writer in German lands. He worked on the large-scale cosmographic and cartographic project Germania Illustrata, of which the core — among them the treatise Germania generalis, four books of love elegies, and De origine, situ, moribus et institutis Norimbergae libellus ("On the origins, site, habits and institutions of Nuremberg") — was published under the title Quatuor libri amorum secundum quatuor latera germanie in Nuremberg (1502).

In 1493, he discovered the writings of Hroswitha of Gandersheim in the monastery of St. Emmaram. He then stole the manuscript and had it mass-printed across the Empire in 1501. Also in 1501, he received a privilege from the Imperial Aulic Council for the printing of his edition of her dramas. This was one of the earliest recorded privileges regarding copyrights granted by the Imperial government. Celtes also discovered a map showing roads of the Roman Empire, the Tabula Peutingeriana, or Peutinger Table. Celtes collected numerous Greek and Latin manuscripts in his function as librarian of the imperial library that was founded by Maximilian, and he claimed to have discovered the missing books of Ovid's Fasti in a letter to the Venetian publisher Aldus Manutius in 1504. The purported new verses had actually been composed by an 11th-century monk and were known to the Empire of Nicaea according to William of Rubruck, but even so, many contemporary scholars believed Celtes and continued to write about the existence of the missing books until well into the 17th century. His epigrams, edited by Kark Hartfelder, were published in Berlin in 1881.

Conrad Celtes was more of a free-thinking humanist and placed a higher value on the ancient pagan, rather than the Christian ideal. His friend Willibald Pirckheimer had blunt discussions with him on that subject. As early as Ode ad Apollinem (1486), he began to style himself as an Apollo-Priest. The most important earthly Phoebus to him was Maximilian, whose symbiotic relationship with the scholar (and thus their double glory) was often reflected in Celtis's literary works.

The Celtis-Gymnasium in Schweinfurt was named after Conrad Celtis.

== See also ==
- Rudolf Agricola
- Joachim Vadian

== Sources ==
- Catholic Encyclopedia.
- Chisholm, Hugh, ed. (1911). "Celtes, Konrad" . Encyclopædia Britannica. Vol. 5 (11th ed.). Cambridge University Press. p. 652.
- Pierre Laurens (ed.) Anthologie de la poésie lyrique latine de la Renaissance (Gallimard, 2004)
- Pierer's Lexikon, Kluepfel, Aschbach.
