= Church of the Holy Trinity, Kraków (Old Town) =

Roman Catholic church in Kraków, Poland

Church of the Holy Trinity
- Kościół Świętej Trójcy
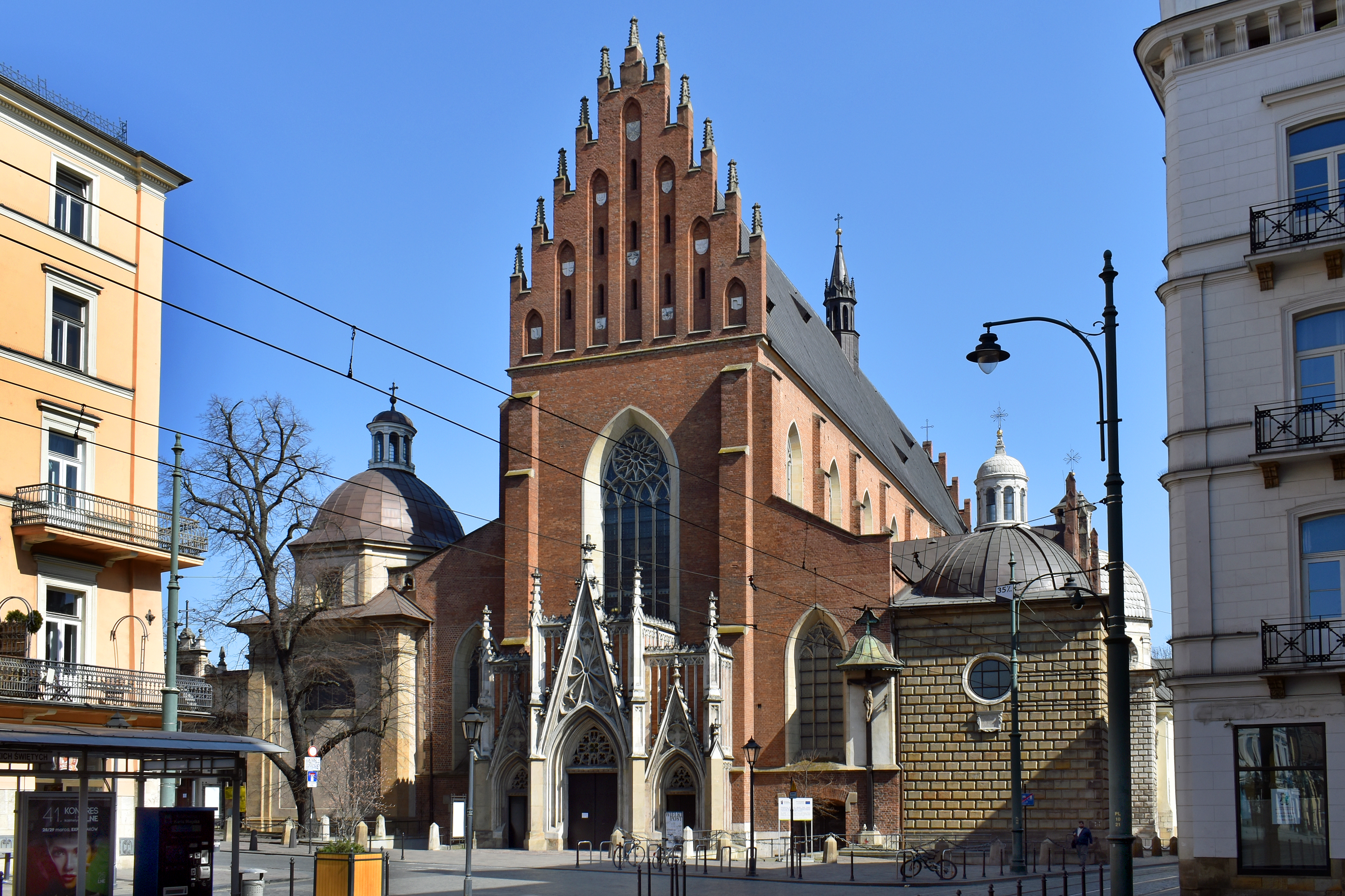
- View from Dominikański Square (from the west)
- Church of the Holy Trinity
- 50°03′33.5″N 19°56′22″E
- Location: Kraków
- Address: 12 Stolarska Street
- Country: Poland
- Denomination: Roman Catholic

History
- Consecrated: 1223

UNESCO World Heritage Site
- Type: Cultural
- Criteria: iv
- Designated: 1978
- Part of: Historic Centre of Kraków
- Reference no.: 29
- Region: Europe and North America

Historic Monument of Poland
- Designated: 1994-09-08
- Part of: Kraków – historic city center
- Reference no.: M.P. 1994 nr 50 poz. 418

The Church of the Holy Trinity (Polish: Kościół Świętej Trójcy), known colloquially as the Dominicans Church (Polish: Kościół dominikanów) is a historic Roman Catholic conventual church of the Order of Preachers located at 12 Stolarska Street in the Old Town of Kraków, Poland.

Built in a gothic style, it also houses a monastery of the Order of Preachers. Its history dates from the year 1223.

Saint Hyacinth of Poland is buried in the church, as well as Polish monarch Leszek II the Black, Renaissance humanist Filippo Buonaccorsi and Jan Zygmunt Skrzynecki.

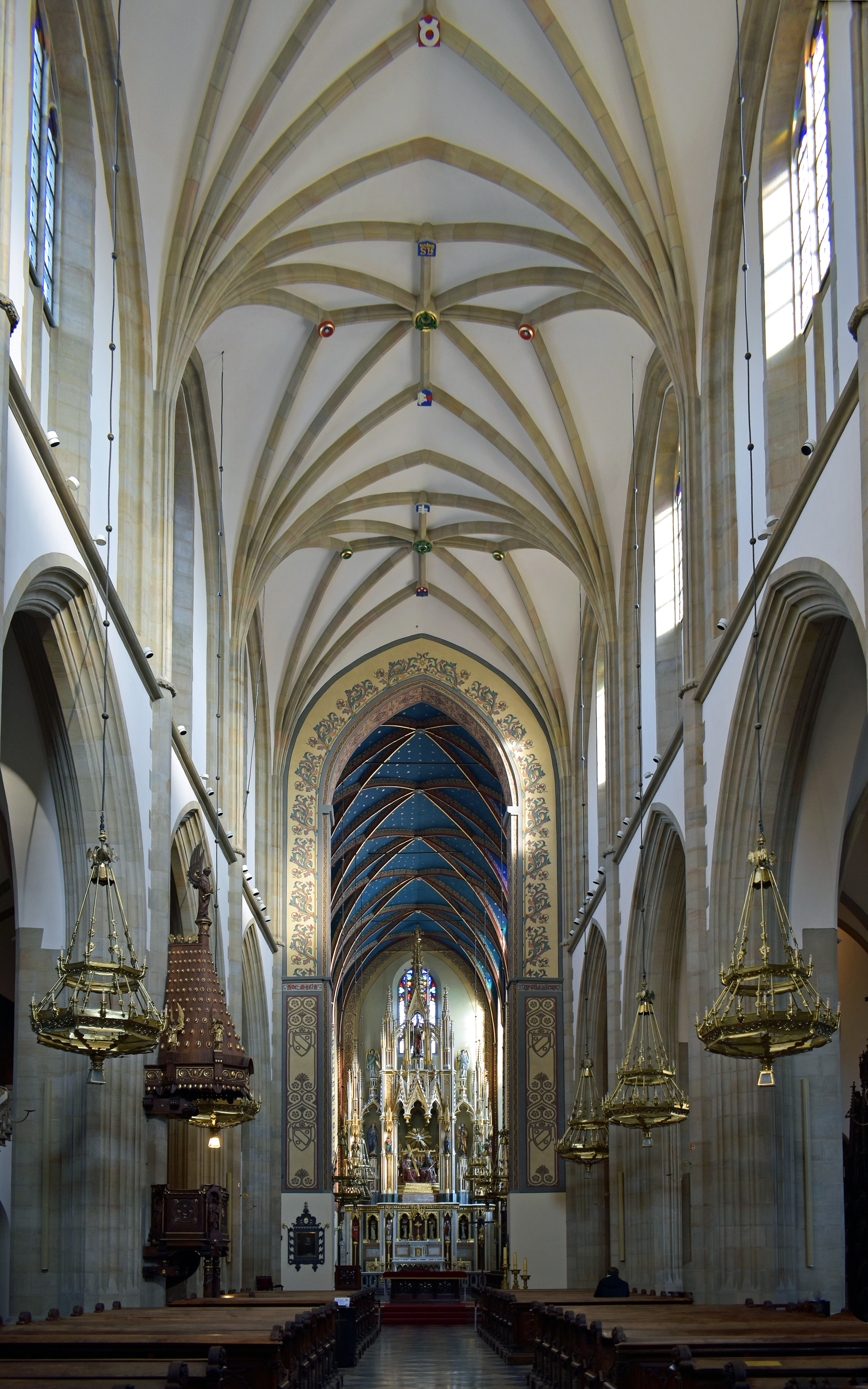
Interior, main nave

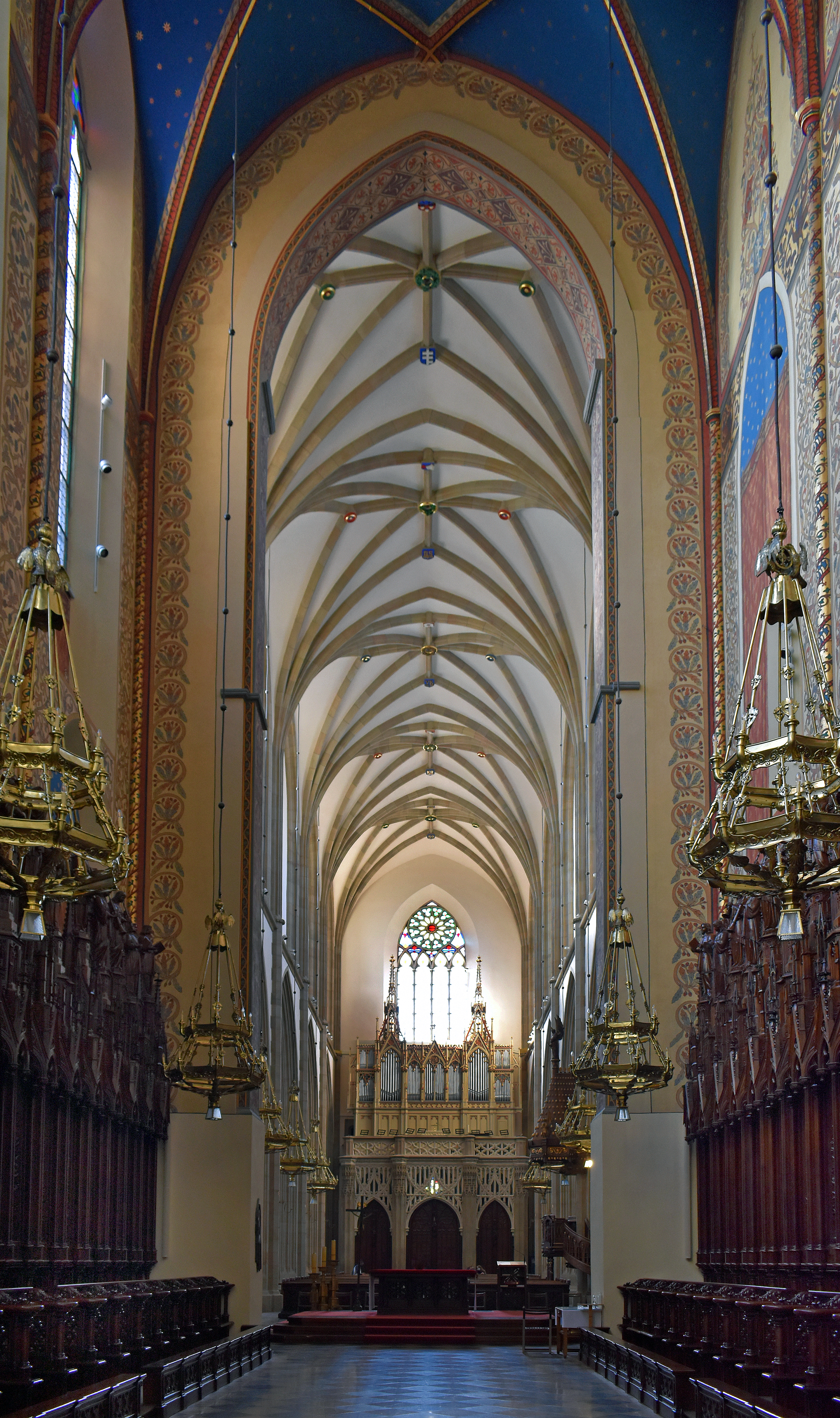
Interior, choir and pipe organ

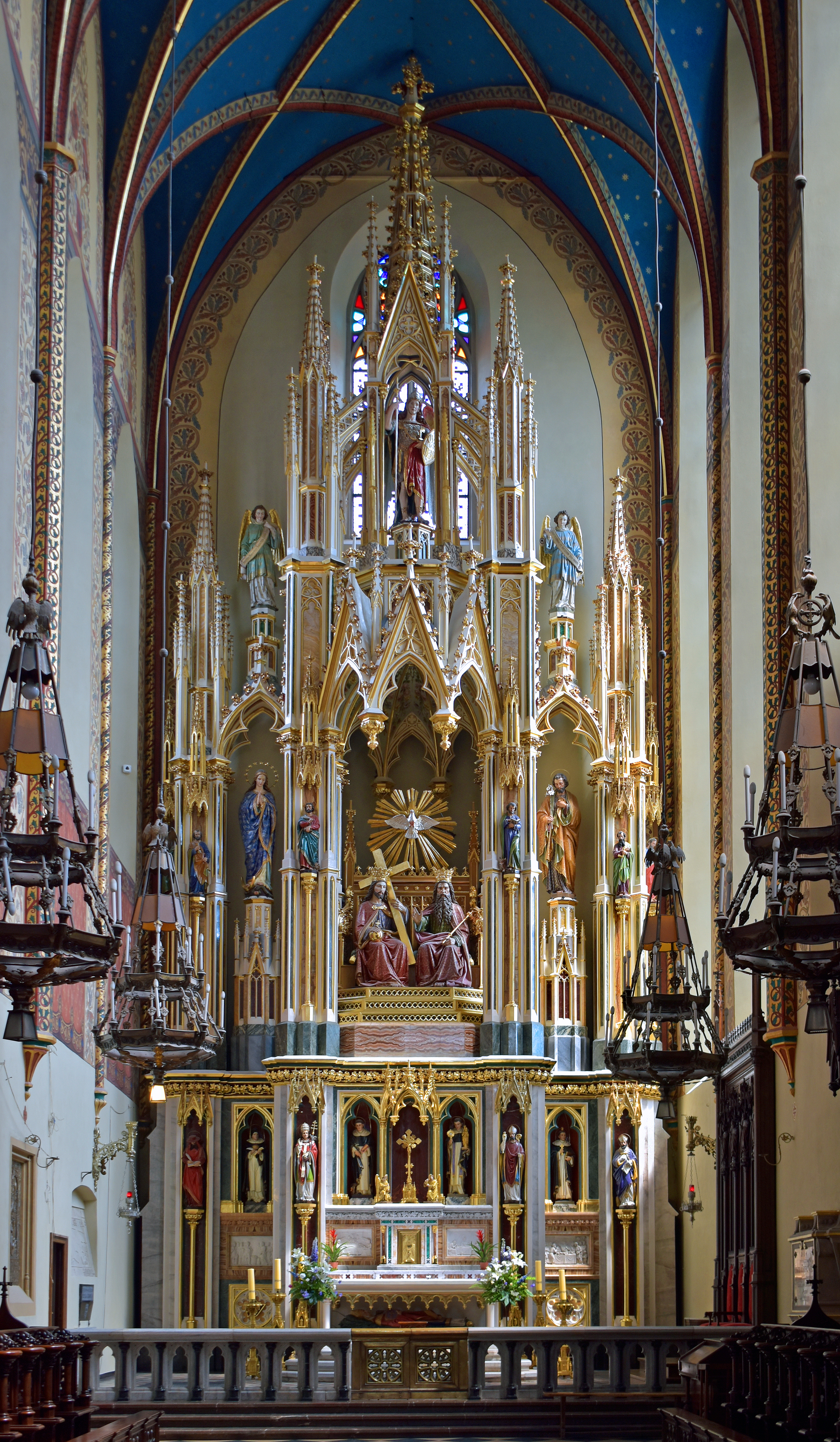
Main altar

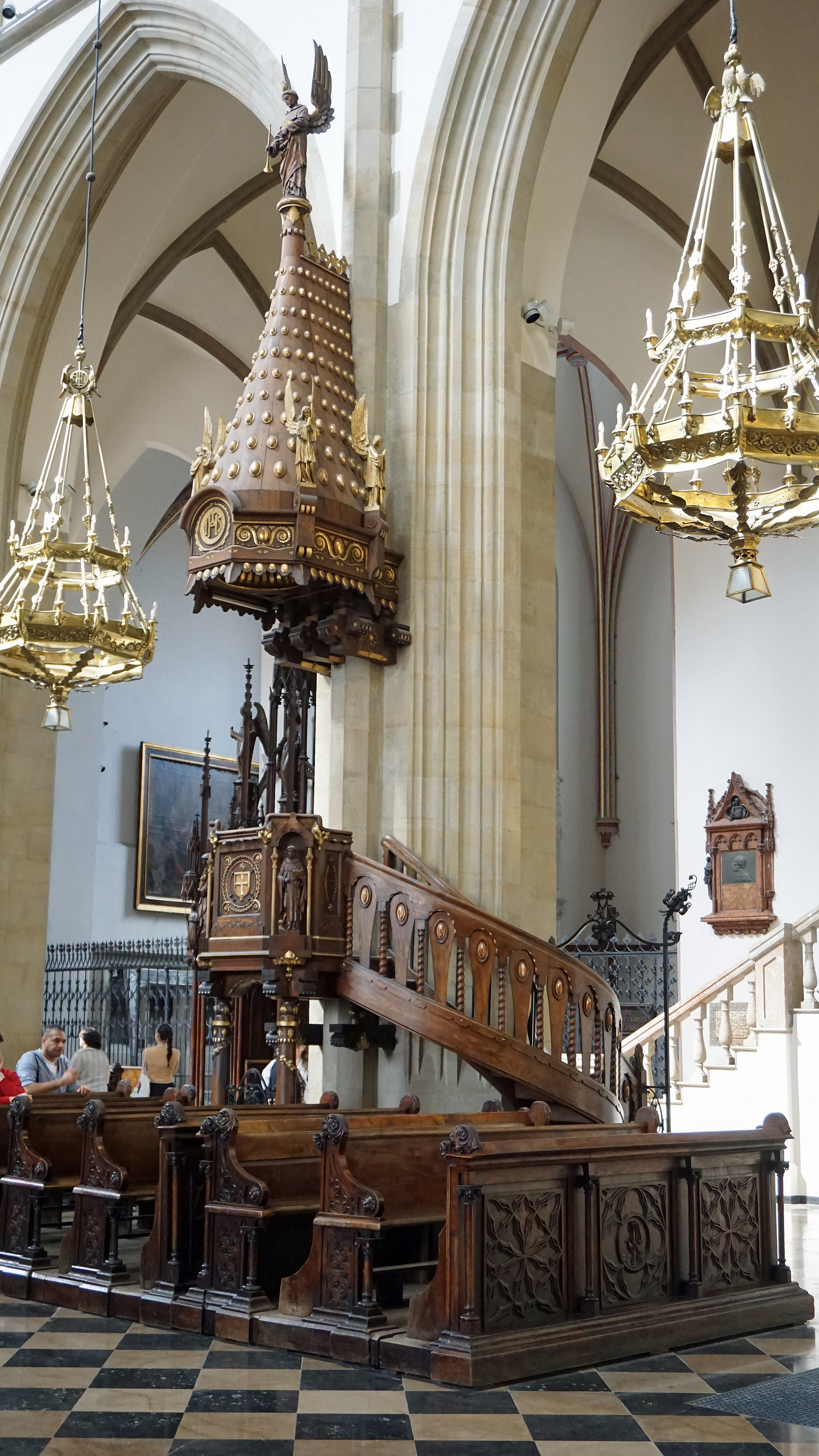
Pulpit

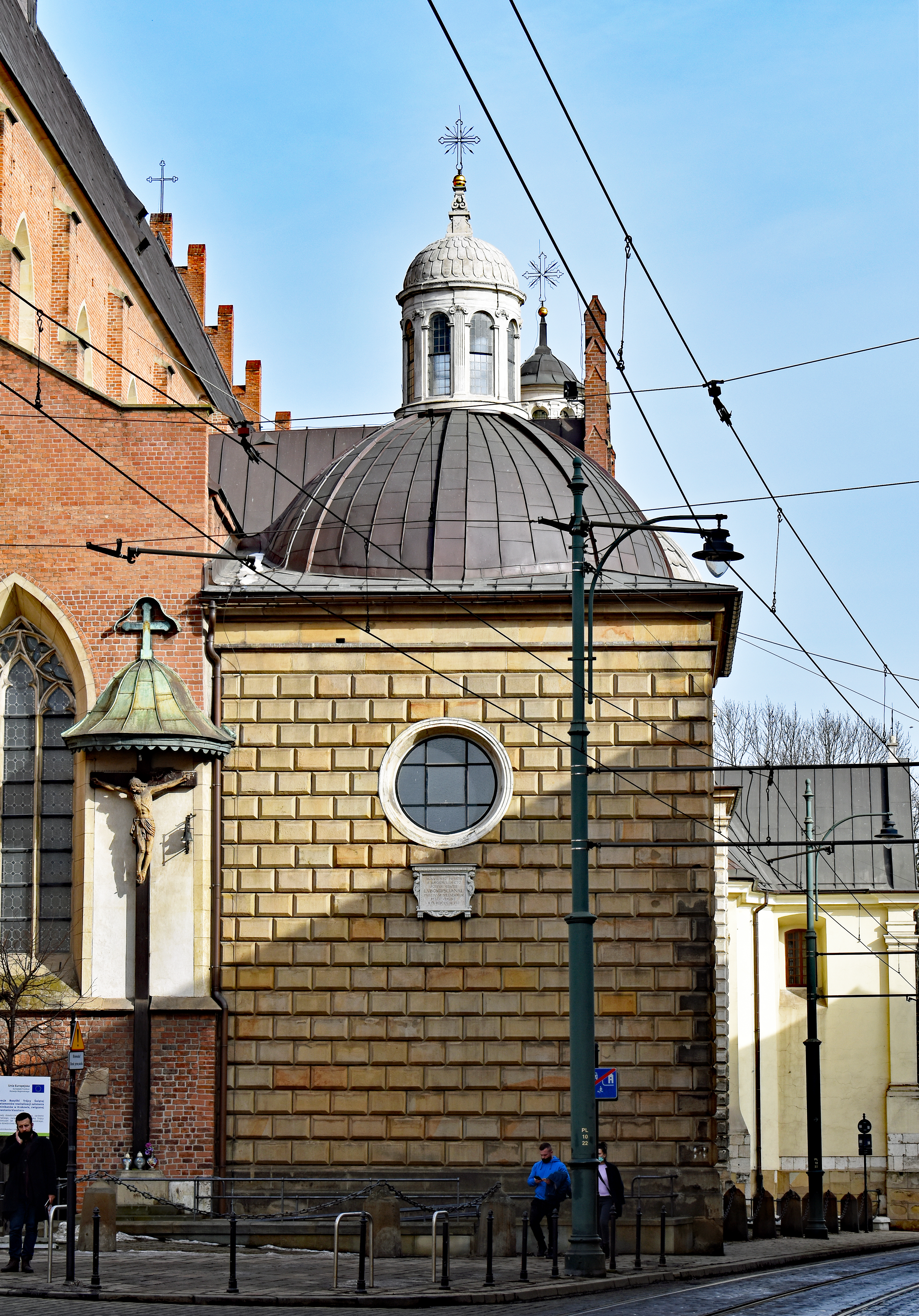
Chapel of St. Rose of Lima seen from the outside.

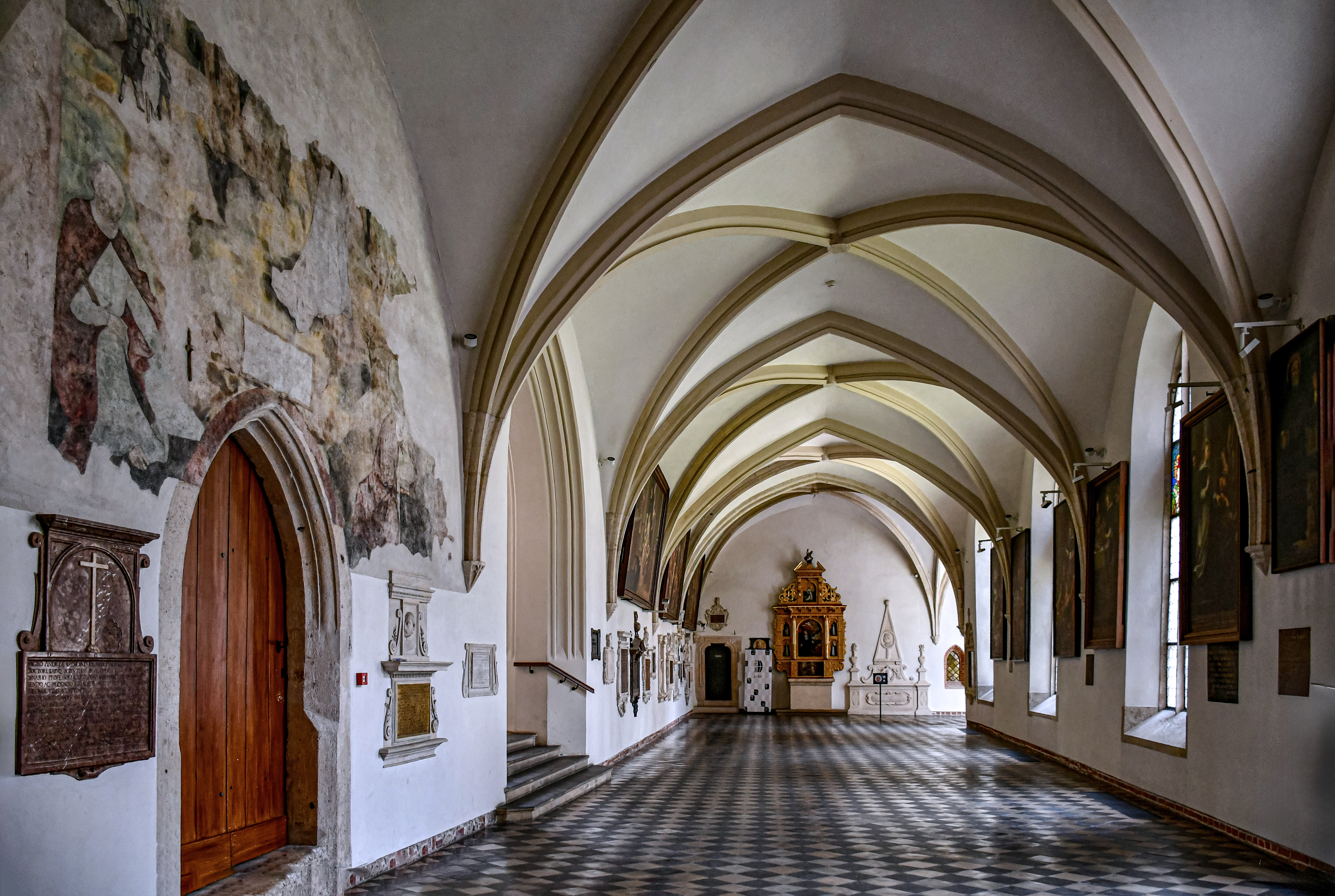
Dominican monastery, western cloister
