= Filippo Buonaccorsi =

Italian humanist

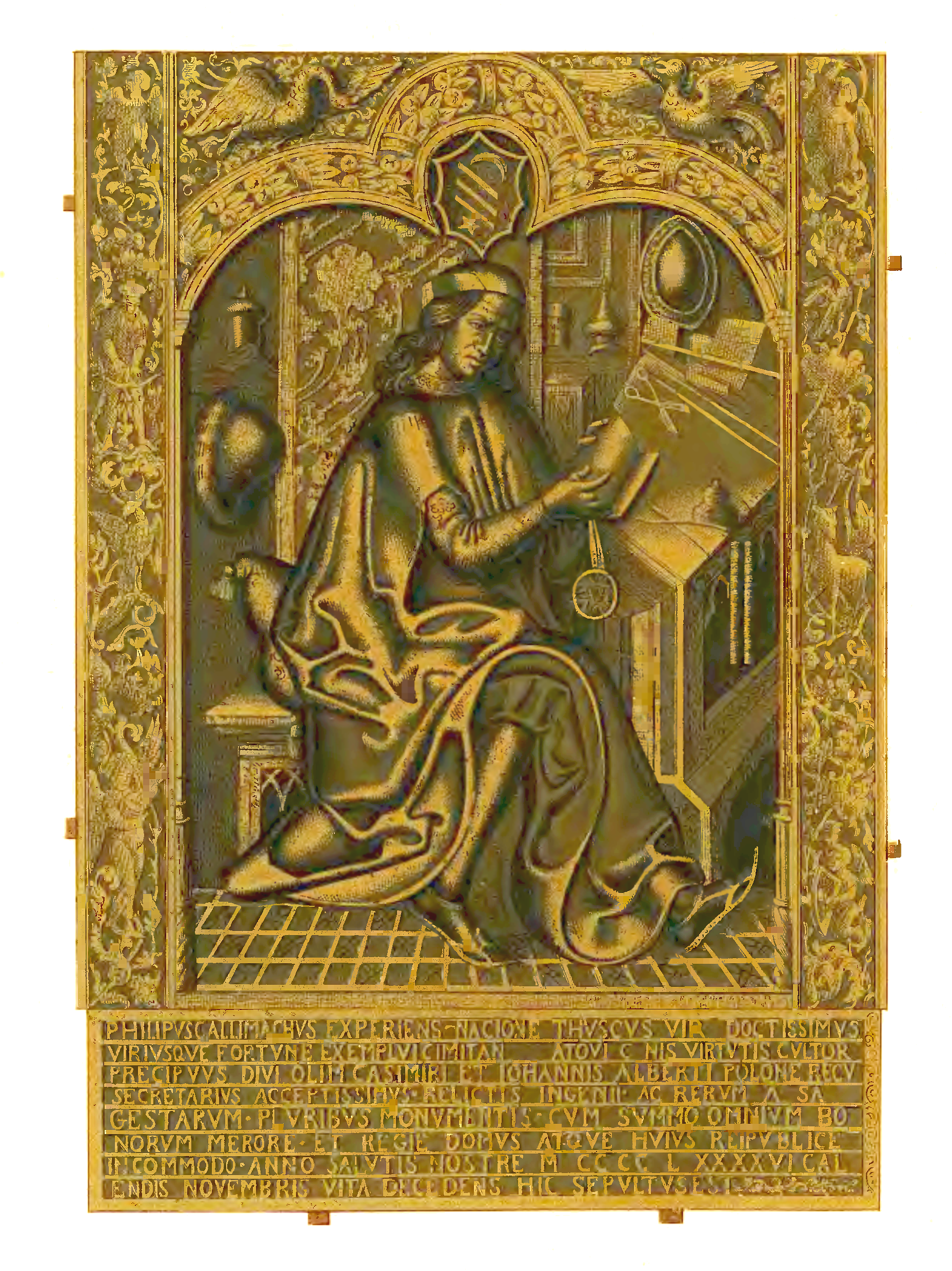
Bronze epitaph of Buonaccorsi, Basilica of the Holy Trinity, Kraków.

Filippo Buonaccorsi, called Callimachus, Callimaco, Bonacurarius, Caeculus, Geminianensis (Latin: Philippus Callimachus Experiens, Bonacursius; Polish: Filip Kallimach, 2 May 1437 – 1 November 1496) was an Italian humanist, writer and diplomat active in Poland.

== Life ==
Filippo Buonaccorsi was born in San Gimignano, in Tuscany, in central Italy. He first appeared in Venice and Rome, where he was secretary to Bishop Bartolomeo Roverella. He moved to Rome in 1462 and became a member of the Rome Academy of Julius Pomponius Laetus.

In 1468, he took part in a supposed assassination attempt upon Pope Paul II and fled to Poland. In Poland he found work with the Bishop of Lwów, Gregory of Sanok.

Pomponius implied he was homosexual and referred to his "perverted habits". The homo-erotic verses (including one addressed to the then Bishop of Segni, Lucio Fazini) which were found in his papers, while earning him a reputation as a sodomite, seem to have been restricted to his youth. This seems to have reflected the aims of the Rome Academy to revive the concept of homosexual love as the ideal, drawing on the precedents set by antiquity. But Buonaccorsi seems to have been particularly active within the group in writing about sexual infatuation between men. However, once in Poland, he seemed to have turned his attention to heterosexual love instead; perhaps a cautious reaction to the violent events in Rome.

Buonaccorsi later became tutor to the sons of Polish King Casimir IV Jagiellon and took part in diplomatic missions. In 1474 he was named royal secretary, in 1476 he served as ambassador to Constantinople, and in 1486 he became the King's representative in Venice. With the accession to the Polish throne of Buonaccorsi's former pupil as John I of Poland, his influence peaked.

He is credited with the first Western use of the word “Balkan” (referring to the Bulgarian mountain range), in a 1490 letter to Pope Innocent VIII, writing as Buonaccorsi Callimaco.

In his writings, Buonaccorsi argued for the strengthening of the king's power at the expense of the aristocracy. In Kraków he joined Conrad Celtis' Sodalitas Vistuliana.

Callimachus wrote poems and prose in Latin, and is best remembered for his biographies of Bishop Zbigniew Oleśnicki, Bishop Gregory of Sanok, and King Władysław III of Poland.

His tomb in Kraków's Basilica of the Holy Trinity was created by Veit Stoss.

== In popular culture ==
Callimaco Buonaccorsi is a recurring figure in Dorothy Dunnett's House of Niccolo series of historical novels, particularly in volume seven, Caprice and Rondo.

== See also ==
- Nicolaus Copernicus
- List of Poles
