= Andreas Wechelus =

Printer and bookseller

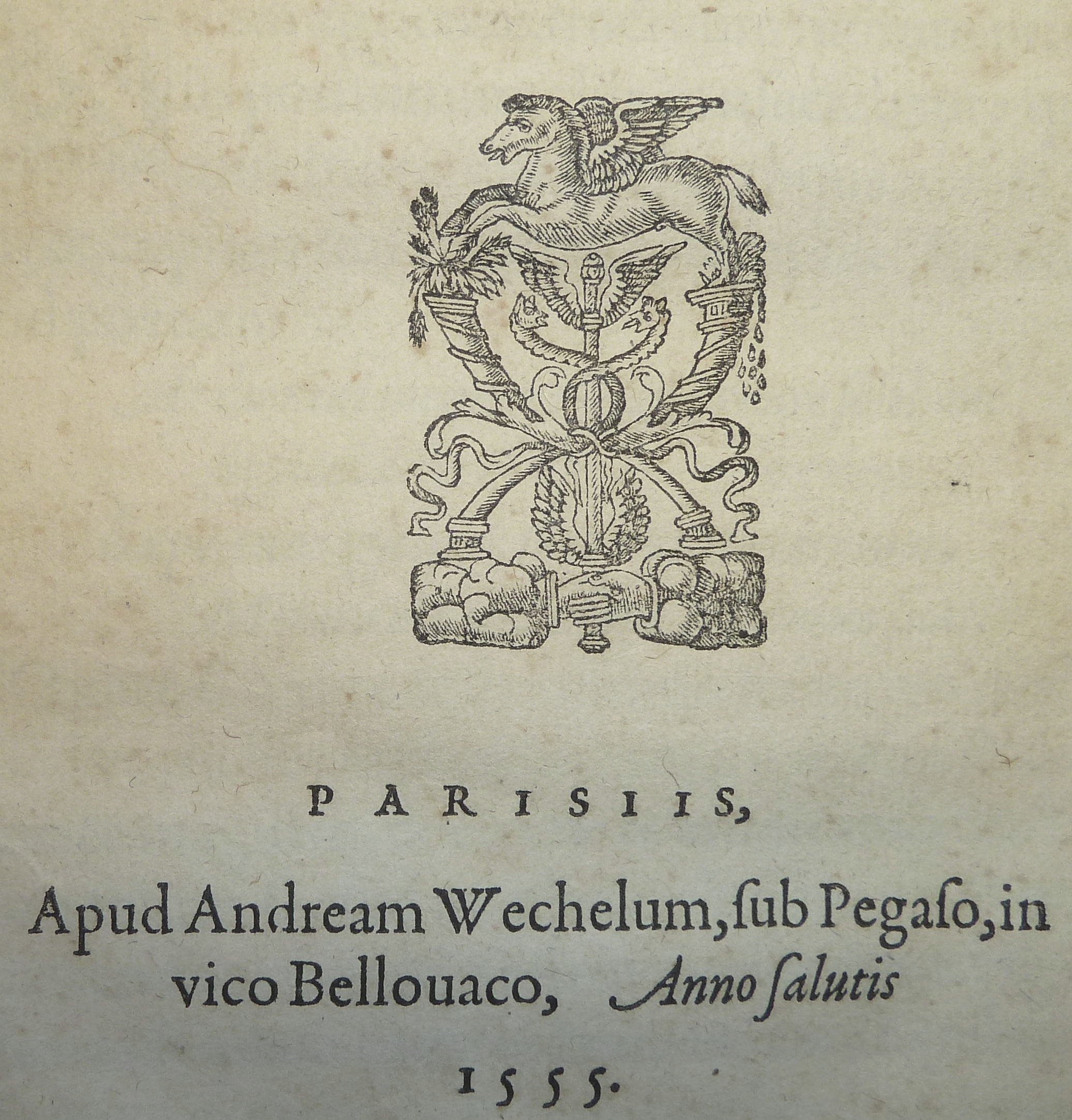
The printer's device of Andreas Wechel in a 1555 book.

Andreas Wechelus (fr. André Wechel, died 1581) was a printer and bookseller active in Paris from 1554 to 1573 and in Frankfurt from 1573 to 1581.

== Biography ==
In 1554, Andreas Wechelus took over the printing office of his father, Chrétien Wechel, on Saint-Jean-de-Beauvais Street. He continued the editorial work initiated by his father and printed texts in Greek, notably the works of Xenophon and Lucian), as well as those of humanists like Jean-Antoine de Baïf and Pierre de Ronsard.

In all likelihood, Wechelus was a supporter of the Reformation, but his friends were German Lutherans, rather than French Calvinists. Nonetheless, he printed the works of Petrus Ramus and Nicolas Durand de Villegagnon.

In 1572, Wechelus escaped the St. Bartholomew's Day massacre thanks to his tenant Hubert Languet, a representative of Augustus, Elector of Saxony. Not long after, Wechelus left Paris for Frankfurt, where he died in 1581.

== Books edited and printed ==
- Pierre de La Ramée. Arithmeticae libri tres. 1555.
- Jean-Antoine de Baïf. Chant de joie du jour des espousailles de François, roi daufin, et de Marie, roine d'Écosse. 1558.
- Pierre Ronsard. La paix. 1559.
- Nicolas Durand de Villegagnon. Responce par le chevalier de Villegaignon aux Remonstrances faictes à la royne mère du roy. 1561.
- Jacques Androuet du Cerceau. Le second livre d'architecture. 1561. .
- Jacques Grévin. Les portraicts anatomiques de toutes les parties du corps humain. 1569.
- Anton Schneeberger. Medicamentorum facile parabilium adversus omnis generis articulorum dolores enumeratio. Frankfurt, 1581.
