= Johann Heß =

German Lutheran theologian (1490–1547)

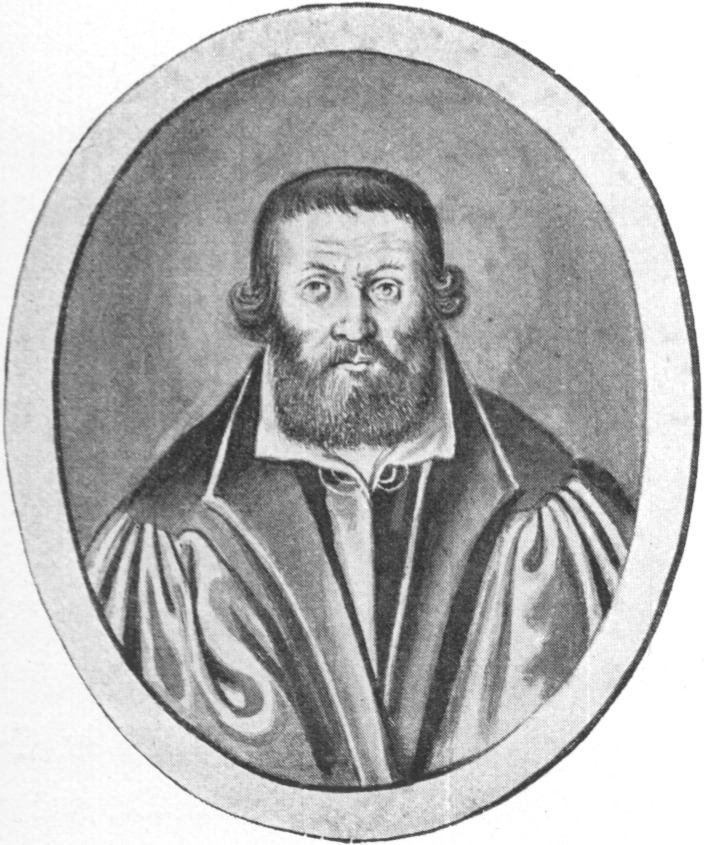
Johann Heß

Johann Heß (or Hess) (23 September 1490 – 5 January 1547) was a German Lutheran theologian and Protestant Reformer of Breslau.

Heß was born in Nuremberg. He attended the universities of Leipzig and Wittenberg, where he was taught in jurisprudence and liberal arts. In Wittenberg he became a follower of Martin Luther, and stayed in touch with the Protestant Reformation when he relocated to Neisse (Nysa) in 1513 as the secretary of Johann V Thurzo, bishop of Breslau. In 1518 Heß moved to Bologna to study theology, completing his studies there in 1519. On the way back to Silesia he stopped in Wittenberg and became a friend of Philipp Melanchthon. In 1520 he was ordained to the priesthood and in 1523 Heß was pressed by the city council of Breslau (probably at the instigation of Laurentius Corvinus) to become pastor of St. Maria Magdalena church. In the coming years he slowly introduced Protestant teachings in Breslau, presenting his ideas in a disputation at St. Dorothy's monastery at Breslau in 1524. His careful approach even normalized the relationship with Catholic bishop Jakob von Salza. Theologically, he, Ambrosius Moibanus, pastor of St. Elisabeth church, and the city council of Breslau sided with Wittenberg and opposed Caspar Schwenckfeld and his followers in Liegnitz Legnica. In 1541 he took part in the Conference of Regensburg. He died in Breslau in 1547.
