= Almanach cracoviense ad annum 1474 =

Calendar that is Poland's oldest known print

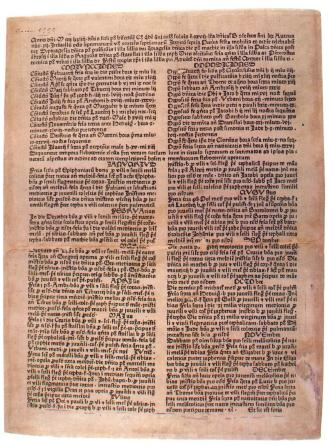
Sole surviving copy of the Almanach cracoviense ad annum 1474

Almanach cracoviense ad annum 1474 (Cracovian Almanac for the Year 1474) is a broadside astronomical wall calendar for the year 1474, and Poland's oldest known print. This single-sheet incunable, known also as the Calendarium cracoviense (Cracovian Calendar), was published at Kraków in 1473 by Kasper Straube, an itinerant Bavarian printer who worked in Kraków between 1473 and 1476. It has been suggested that the Almanach was written by astronomer Petrus Gaszowiec.

Like other almanacs and calendars of its day, the Almanach lists Church holidays and astronomical data, including planetary oppositions and conjunctions. It also provides medical advice, listing the best days for bloodletting, depending on the age and illness of the patient. The Almanach's text is in Latin.

At the time of its publication, the technology of printing with movable type was just 20 years old and remained almost entirely confined to Germans, who in the 1470s spread it widely through Europe. Printing appeared early in that decade in France and the Netherlands, and after 1473 in England and Spain.

The only surviving copy of Almanach cracoviense measures 37 cm by 26.2 cm, and is in the collections of the Jagiellonian University.

== See also ==
- Hortulus Animae
- History of printing in Poland
