= Theodora Wangerin =

American Seventh-day Adventist missionary (1888–1978)

Theodora Scharffenberg Wangerin (December 17, 1888 - March 19, 1978) was an American Seventh-Day Adventist missionary in Korea.

== Biography ==
A native of Milwaukee, Wangerin was born into a family of German extraction; her sister Mimi Scharffenberg also achieved some renown as a missionary in Korea.

Theodora married Rufus Wangerin on May 5, 1909, and accompanied him when he was sent on a mission to Korea two months later. The couple opened the mission station at Kyungsun in 1911. Suffering from meningitis, their infant died in June 1916, and Rufus contracted tuberculosis around the same time; consequently, the family returned to the United States, but he died soon thereafter, and Theodora with her two surviving daughters returned to Korea in 1917 to continue her work.

At first she ran training classes and a variety of small group activities; in 1931, due to her facility with the Korean language and literary abilities, she was given the general editorship of the Seventh-Day Adventists' press in Seoul. Despite an eighth-grade education, she remained in this post for close to 20 years. The religious monthly Signs of the Times, published by the church, reached under her guidance a circulation of 40,000 in the late 1930s, said to be the largest of any monthly publication in Korea at that time. She also wrote and translated religious literature, and encouraged a body of Korean writers to produce material for the church as well. Notably, she facilitated the dissemination of much of Ellen White's most important writing in Korean translation.

With the onset of the Korean War in 1950, she was forced to move her activities to Japan. She continued to work there for more than a year before the inability to export her work to Korea forced her permanent return to the United States. She died in Redding, California.

== Legacy ==
Wangerin's papers are housed at the Adventist Heritage Center of the James White Library at Andrews University.
