= Mimi Scharffenberg =

American missionary

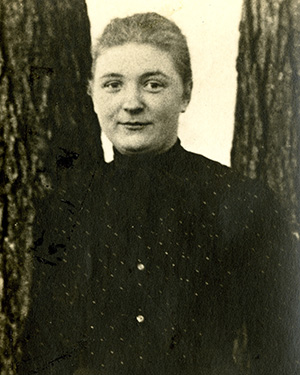

Mimi Scharffenberg (November 7, 1883 – before 1926) was an American missionary; she was the first single woman to be a Seventh-Day Adventist missionary to Korea.

== Early life ==
Scharffenberg was born in Missouri into a Lutheran family, although she later moved to Wisconsin. Her sister, Theodora Wangerin, was also a Seventh-Day Adventist missionary.

== Missionary activities ==
Scharffenberg first moved to Soonan to "engage in school work", which officially began in 1907. There, she bought a small home that she later shared with another missionary, May Scott, in September 1908.

In 1909 Scharffenberg moved to Seoul with another missionary family.

In 1915 she was among the delegation sent to the Asiatic Division Conference of Seventh-day Adventists.

Scharffenberg returned to the United States at some point afterwards, and had died by 1926.
