= Biernat of Lublin =

Polish poet, fabulist, translator and physician

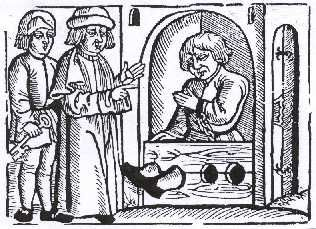
Woodcut from Żywot Ezopa Fryga (The Life of Aesop the Phrygian), Kraków, 1578 ed.

Biernat of Lublin (Polish: Biernat z Lublina, Latin Bernardus Lublinius, ca. 1465 – after 1529) was a Polish poet, fabulist, translator, and physician. He was one of the first Polish-language writers known by name, and the most interesting of the earliest ones. He expressed plebeian, Renaissance, and religiously liberal opinions.

== Life ==
Biernat was born in Lublin and wrote the first book printed in the Polish language: printed in 1513, in Kraków, at Poland's first printing establishment, operated by Florian Ungler—a prayer-book, Raj duszny (Hortulus Animae, Eden of the Soul).

Biernat also penned the first secular work in Polish literature: a collection of verse fables, plebeian and anticlerical in nature: Żywot Ezopa Fryga (The Life of Aesop the Phrygian), 1522.

== Works ==
- Raj duszny (Eden of the Soul), 1513
- Żywot Ezopa Fryga (The Life of Aesop the Phrygian), 1522
- Dialog Polinura z Charonem (Dialog of Polinur and Charon), ca. 1507

== See also ==
- Physician writer
- Fable#Fabulists
- Fables and Parables
