= Izaak Aaronowicz =

Izaak Aaronowicz, born Izaak ben Aron Prostitz (died 1629) was a Polish author and printer of Hebrew books.

He came from Prostějov in Moravia, and moved to Kraków. In addition to many works of Hebrew, appreciated by Orientalists, is his edition of the Babylonian Talmud (1603–1605) in 12 volumes. Fluent in Hebrew and "learned in the Bible," he wrote several books on religious figures.
