= Stanisław Grzepski =

Polish Humanist mathematician

Stanisław Grzepski (1524–1570) was a Polish humanist and mathematician.

== Sources ==
- Linke, Waldemar (2019). "'The Sarmatian In Languages Trained'. Staniskaw Grzepski (1524-1570) As A Researcher Of The Hebrew Bible And The Septuagint". Studia Theologica Varsaviensia – via Academia.edu.
- Linke, Waldemar (2023). "A Year in Stanisław Grzepski's (1524–1570) "De multiplici siclo et talento hebraico"". Verbum Vitae – via Academia.edu.
- Bibliografia polska (in Polish)
