= Laurentius Corvinus =

Silesian scholar

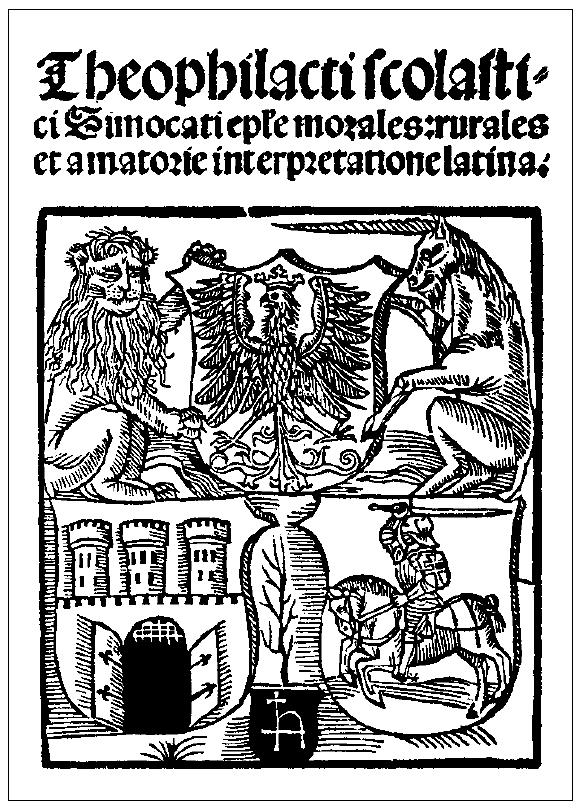
Theophilacti Scolastici Simocatti Epistole morales, rurales at amatoriae, interpretatione Latina

Laurentius Corvinus (German: Laurentius Rabe; Polish: Wawrzyniec Korwin; 1465–1527) was a Silesian scholar who lectured as an "extraordinary" (i.e. untenured) professor at the University of Krakow when Nicolaus Copernicus began to study there. He also attracted a reputation as one of the finest Silesian poets of the early Renaissance and as an important agent for cultural and religious change in his adopted home of Breslau (now Wrocław).

Laurentius Corvinus was born as Laurentius Rabe in Neumarkt (now Środa Śląska) in Lower Silesia, about 30 km east of Legnica west of Vrotzuav, son of Barthel Rabe, a furrier and member of the local council. As a student at Kraków, he Latinized his name, possibly under the influence of Conrad Celtis, and became known as Corvinus (a Latin translation of his German name Rabe, or raven). After receiving his M.A. at the University of Kraków, Corvinus lectured on "De ente et essentia" (1492) and Aristotle's Libri Posteriorum (1493); the young Nicolaus Copernicus was probably one of his students during this time. Corvinus later helped to publish Copernicus' Latin translation of the Letters of the Byzantine Greek poet Theophylactus Simocatta by sending Copernicus's translation to the printer Johann Haller in Kraków to be published in 1509. He also supplied the printed edition of Copernicus' translation with two poems, one of which describes the journey of Corvinus and his wife Anna back to Breslau, and also makes reference to Copernicus' interest in astronomy. It is not entirely clear whether or not Corvinus' poem actually refers to Copernicus' heliostatic theory, but in any case it is important as a very early witness for Copernicus' involvement in astronomical speculation.

Corvinus was also close friend to another Silesian, Johannes Sommerfeld, who also taught at Kraków while Copernicus was there. He was influenced by Conrad Celtis and Copernicus befriended the group of humanists. As a student and later magister at the University of Krakow he was acquainted with astronomy; as magister he lectured at the faculty for several years, including the first years of Copernicus’ studies in Kraków.

After leaving Kraków, Corvinus worked as school rector and then city secretary (Stadtschreiber) at Schweidnitz' (now Świdnica) (1494–1497). He then moved to Breslau to work as rector of St Elisabeth's school (1497–1503) and then as one of the senior city secretaries (1503–1506), before moving to a position as city secretary of Toruń (1506–1508). He and his wife then moved back to Breslau in 1508, where he resumed his position as senior city secretary; they remained in Breslau, living in a house near the Siebenradmühle (near the present site of the university library), for the rest of their lives.

Corvinus published humanistic writings and poems, many of them religious and philosophical in nature. He was greatly influenced by the Franciscan spirituality of St Bonaventure and the Neoplatonism of Marsilio Ficino. In the spirit of Italian and German humanists he described his adopted home of Breslau in terms borrowed from classical mythology as the new home of the Muses. He was also involved in the introduction of the Lutheran Reformation to Breslau, and personally took part in Johann Heß's disputation in 1524, where he declaimed a poem celebrating Martin Luther as a hero of religion. He was also involved in an epistolary exchange on religious matters with Stanisław Byliński, canon at Przemyśl, published by Byliński in 1531.

== Writings ==
(Only first editions of printed works noted. Works in manuscript not noted)

- Cosmographia dans manuductionem in tabulas Claudii Ptolomei, edited by Heinrich Bebel (Basel: [Keßler], 1496)
- Carminum structura ([Leipzig]: Landsberg, [1496])
- Latinum ydeoma ([Leipzig]: [Kachelofen or Lotter], [c. 1498–1500])
- Carmen […] de Nympharum conquestione super hyemis rigiditate[m] (Leipzig: Thanner, 1500)
- Hortulus elegantiarum (Kraków, 1502 ed. recorded by Panzer; earliest extant edition is Breslau: Baumgart, 1503)
- Carmen elegiacum […] de Apolline et novem musis (Breslau: Baumgart, 1503)
- Epicedium, in Serenissimum ac Gloriosissimum Principem Alexandrum, Poloniæ Regem (Kraków: Haller, 1506, lost)
- Dialogus carmine et soluta oratione conflatus de Mentis saluberrima persuasione ad honesta ingenuarum artium studia (Leipzig: Schumann, 1516)
- Epithalamium. Laurenti Corvini. In nuptiis sacræ regiæ Maiestatis. Poloniæ […] (Kraków: Hieronymus Vietor, 1518)
- Cursus sancti Bonaventuræ de passione domini (Breslau: Dyon, 1521)
