= Hans Springinklee =

German painter (c.1490–c.1540)

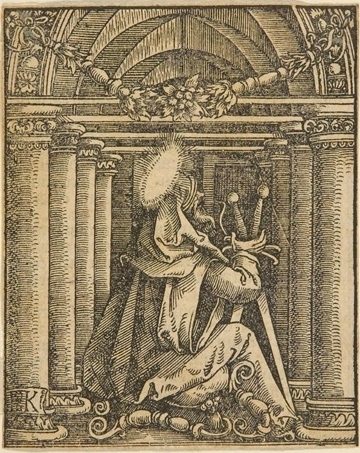
St. Paul With Two Swords — woodcut by Springinklee

Hans Springinklee (c.1490/c.1495 – c.1540) was a German artist from Nuremberg, best known for his woodcuts. He was a pupil of Albrecht Dürer.

== Life ==
Little written evidence remains of Springinklee's life, and neither his exact dates of birth or death are known. He was born in Nuremberg between 1490 and 1495, was alive in 1524, and died no later than 1540. In 1547, Johann Neudörffer the Elder wrote that Springinklee had lived with, and learned his craft from, Albrecht Dürer. His first woodcuts date from 1512–1513, but there is no evidence of his presence in Nuremberg after 1524, and it is presumed that he had left Nuremberg by that date. The first documentary evidence dates to 1520, when the council of Nuremberg commissioned him to decorate rooms in Nuremberg Castle before a visit of the Holy Roman Emperor Charles V. On 10 September 1527, his two daughters mentioned that he had left them in Nuremberg three years before, and his father, Jörg Springinklee, had been paying for their maintenance. His name is absent from church records, but the astronomer Johann Gabriel Doppelmayr said in 1730 that Springinklee had lived in Nuremberg until 1540.

== Works ==
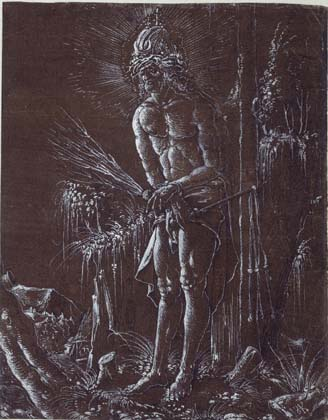
Man of Sorrows, chiaroscuro drawing, c. 1514

As a pupil of Dürer, Springinklee was involved in creating a number of works commissioned by Emperor Maximilian I, including the monumental 192-panel woodcut the Triumphal Arch. The first prints with his monogram, HSK, date to 1513: Das Wunder der Heilige Wilgeffortis (The Miracle of Saint Wilgefortis), and a sheet from Maximilian's Weißkunig entitled Kaiser Maximilian ehret das Andenken der Vorväter (Emperor Maxamilian honouring the memory of his ancestors).

From 1516, Springinklee mainly produced illustrations for the bibles published by Anton Koberger, mostly of Old Testament scenes. He also created over 100 woodcuts for several editions of the prayerbook Hortulus animae.

Springinklee's paintings are less well known. Some church paintings and altarpieces in the vicinity of Nuremberg have been attributed to Springinklee. The Kunstmuseum Basel holds a chiaroscuro drawing of a standing Man of Sorrows from 1514, in white on a dark brown ground. Nuremberg Castle contains some frescoes by Springinklee.
