= Wacław Anczyc =

Polish printer and historian

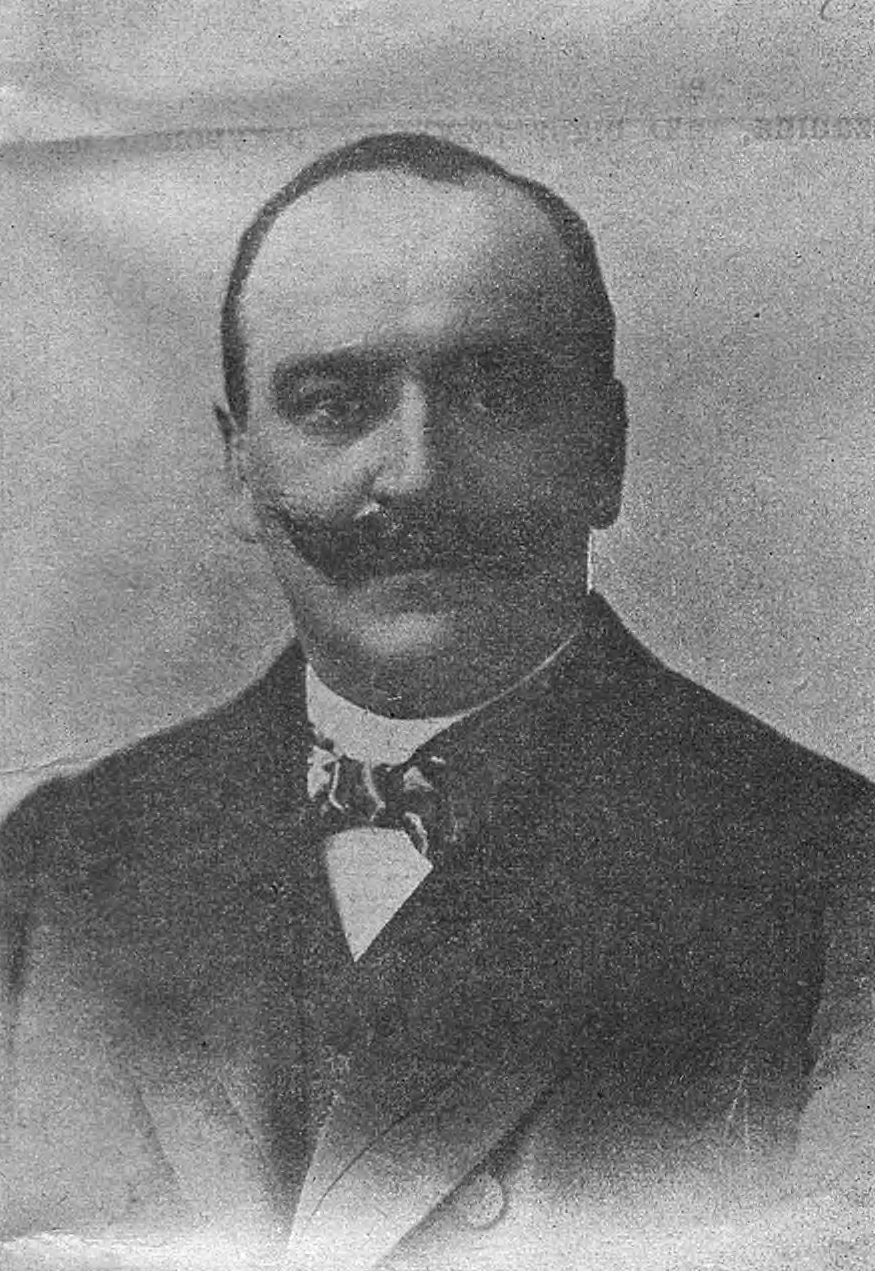
Wacław Zygmunt Anczyc

Wacław Zygmunt Anczyc (February 4, 1866, in Warsaw – September 27, 1938, in Kraków) was a Polish printer and historian, son of Władysław Ludwik Anczyc. He studied history at the Jagiellonian University Faculty of Literature and in Leipzig. After 1883, when his father died, he inherited a printing press in Kraków. In 1900 he moved his printing press to the monastery of the Resurrection. He expanded and modernized the industry, making a large contribution to the development of printing in Poland. In 1908 he founded a compulsory school for students of printing in Kraków.
