= Łazarz Andrysowicz =

Polish Renaissance printer

Łazarz Andrysowicz (died 1577) was a Polish Renaissance printer, founder of the Oficyna Łazarzowa. He published about 270 books, prized for their high quality for the times.

== Biography ==
Łazarz Andrysowicz was born in Stryków on an unknown date. In 1550, he married Barbara, widow of the Kraków printer Hieronymus Vietor, and thus became the owner of the latter's printing office. Having expanded and updated the printing facilities, Andrysowicz began printing books as the Drukarnia Łazarzowa (Łazarz Printing House). After Andrysowicz's death, his son, Jan Januszowski took over his printing business.

== Publishing activities ==
Andrysowicz's printing office published about 270 works, of which about 130 were in Polish. The press was famed for its high-quality printing and editing. Andrysowicz published a number of works important to the development of Polish learning and intellectual life, among them Stanisław Grzepski's Geometria to jest miernicka nauka (1566), the first Polish language work on geodesy and surveying; and Olbrycht Strumieński's O sprawie, sypaniu, wymierzaniu i rybieniu stawów(1573), the first Polish-language work on fish farming and civil engineering. His musical publications are also valued; he printed the works of Mikołaj Gomółka, Wacław of Szamotuły, and Bálint Bakfark, among others.

== Bibliography ==
- Literatura polska. Przewodnik encyklopedyczny, vol. 1. Warsaw: PWN, 1984.
- Iłowiecki, Maciej. Dzieje nauki polskiej. Warsaw: Interpress, 1981.
- Michalski, Grzegorz. An outline history of Polish music. Interpress, 1979.
- Sawicki, Kazimierz. Pięć wieków geodezji polskiej. Szkice historyczne XV–XIX wiek. Warsaw: Państwowe Przedsiębiorstwo Wydawnictw Kartograficznych, 1964.
- Sutkowski,Stefan. The history of music in Poland: 1500-1600. The Renaissance. Warsaw, 2002.
