= Scharffenberg family =

Polish family of printers and bookdealers

The Scharffenberg family (Polish: Szarffenberg) was a multi‑generational dynasty of printers, publishers, and booksellers active in the Crown of the Kingdom of Poland and neighbouring regions of Central Europe during the sixteenth century. Members of the family worked across several branches of the book trade, including printing, paper production, and the creation of woodcut illustrations. Their presses operated in Kraków, Wrocław, Nysa, Lusatia, and Zgorzelec (Görlitz). Some Scharffenberg printing houses continued to function for up to two centuries after the family's direct involvement, under new ownership.

== Marek Scharffenberg (d.1545) ==
Marek Szarffenberg, who started the family's printing business, was a cousin of Hieronymus Vietor and worked for a time for Jan Haller, both famous early Kraków printers. For many years he worked in the book trade and financed the printing houses of Vietor and Florian Ungler. Marek set up his own printing house in 1543, not long before his death. Marek expanded his business venture to include bookbinding and, with the acquisition of two paper mills outside Kraków, paper production.

=== Works ===
- Breviarium Cracoviense (1524). Published jointly by Marek Scharffenberg, Jan Haller, and Hieronymus Vietor.

== Mikołaj and Stanisław Scharffenberg ==
Marek's sons, Stanisław and Mikołaj, were trained in the family business and worked with their father. After his death, they continued the business, which their mother, Agnieszka, ran with them. In 1554, Stanisław and Mikołaj were ennobled by the Holy Roman Emperor Ferdinand I.

After their mother's death, the brothers went their separate ways. Stanisław remained in the family home near ul. św. Anny, where he printed and ran a bookshop until 1584. Mikołaj (d. 1606) moved to ul. Grodzka and set up his own office in 1565. There, he published various official documents including statutes and privileges, as well as historical literature. Sigismund II Augustus awarded him the privilege of being the official printer of royal statutes and named him the typographer of his chancery. Stefan Batory continued Mikołaj's business relations with the Crown, granting him a privilege to print and sell statutes and chronicles and naming him the court printer. Mikołaj set up a second, mobile printing shop, which followed the king and his chancery on their travels. At Mikołaj's death, his oldest son, Jan, attempted to continue his father's printing business. However, he soon fell into debt and, in 1616, he sold the business to Franciszek Cezary.

=== Works ===
- Jan Kasprowicz Nycza, ed. and trans., Scharffenberg Bible or Leopolita's Bible (1561).

== Maciej Scharffenberg ==
Maciej (who also used the surname Ostrowski or Ostrogórski), a relative of Marek's, set up his own printing shop around 1526, though he worked with Marek until at least 1531 and printed all of his books. Benefiting from the patronage of Bona Sforza, Maciej was granted a privilege to print Kraków calendars, a very lucrative product. When Maciej died in 1547, his wife, Helena, took over his business until their son, Hieronim, was old enough to take over the family business. It operated under his name in 1548-1556, although Hieronim himself died in 1555. Hieronim's wife then ran the business.

== Silesian Scharffenbergs ==
Kryspin Szarffenberg, from the Silesian branch of the family, settled in Zgorzelec in 1545, where he ran his own bookshop. Shortly thereafter, he moved to Wrocław where he received official approval to work as a printer and producer of woodcuts. He bought a print shop from Andrzej Winkler. At Kryspin's death in 1576, his son, Jan, took over the printing office, which he ran until 1586. The company continued for another four years until 1590, when Jan's widow, Magdalena, remarried and the business was transferred to the family of her second husband, Jerzy Baumann. The Baumann family continued to run the business until 1748.

== See also ==
- History of printing in Poland

== Bibliography ==
- Bułhak, Henryk. Polonia Typographica Saeculi Sedecimi / Tłoczenie Polskie XVI Stulecia: Monografie i Podoboizny Zasobów Drukarskich, ed. Alodia Kawecka-Gryczowa, vol. 12: Maciej Szarfenberg. Kraków, 1527–1547. (Wrocław; Warsaw; Kraków; Gdańsk: Zaklad Narodowy im. Ossolińskich, 1981).
- Szwejkowska, H. Książka drukowana XV-XVIII wieku: zarys historyczny. Wrocław: PWN, 1987.
