= Hieronymus Vietor =

Silesia-born printer and publisher (c.1480–1546 or 1547)

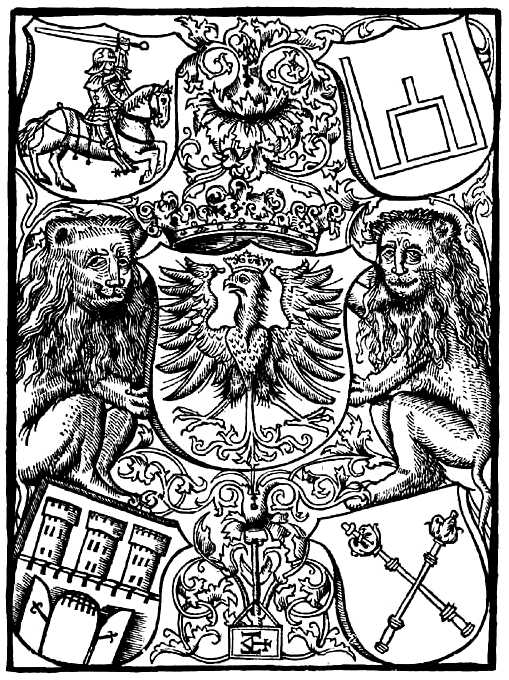
Printer's mark of Vietor as it appears in a print of Georg Ebner's Dialogus Philosophie de ritu omni verborum venustate editus, printed by Vietor in Vienna in 1513.

Hieronymus Vietor (c. 1480, in Liebenthal (now Lubomierz) Silesia – late 1546 or early 1547, in Kraków) was a printer and publisher born in Silesia and active in Vienna and Kraków. Famous for the quality and quantity of his prints, he is considered one of the most important early book printers in Poland, also because he was the first to regularly print in Polish. He is also known as Hieronymus Philovallensis (a Latinization of the name of his birthplace, Lubomierz/Liebenthal) or Hieronymus Doliarius, or in Polish as Hieronim Wietor or Büttner.

== Life ==
Hieronymus' birthname was Büttner, sometimes also given as Binder or Pinder. As son of Augustin Büttner, Hieronymus was born about 1480 in Liebenthal, today Lubomierz. In 1497, he was immatriculated at the Jagellonian University at Kraków, where he obtained the degree of Bachelor of Arts two years later. Subsequently, he worked as a bookbinder and learned the trade and the art of book printing probably in the printing shop of Johannes Haller. In 1505, his name appears on a list of bookbinders of Kraków.

In 1508 Vietor moved to Vienna, where he worked for one year in the print shop of Johannes Winterburger. (Note: German and Polish historians differ on the precise sequence of events. According to German references, Vietor was still owner of a bookshop at Kraków in 1510, and had the Pangyrici... printed by Winterburger in Vienna and only later established himself as a printer in Vienna. They agree that he opened his own shop in Vienna in 1510 and printed the Parvulus philosophie naturalis there.) He printed Paulus of Krosno's Pangyrici ad divum Ladislaum Pannoniae while at Winterburger's. In 1510 he opened his own print shop, the first work being Joachim Vadian's edition of Parvulus philosophie naturalis of Petrus Dresdensis, completed on August 16, 1510. (Note: Vietor wrote his impressum as "Excusa sunt haec Viennae per Hieronymu[m] Vietoris Philoualle[m]. xvii. Kal. Sep. Anno. M.D.X." The Roman date "xvii Kal. Sep." is the 17th day before the Calends of September, counting inclusively, i.e., August 16.)

From September 1510 to December 1514, Vietor formed a partnership with the printer Johannes Singriener. Subsequently, Vietor again had his own print shop, located in 1516 at the Weihenburggasse in Vienna. Throughout his time in Vienna, he maintained his contacts to Kraków, such as to bookseller Markus Scharffenberg, and courted the nobles of Kraków. In 1515, he presented king Sigismund I with a dedicated copy of Joachim Vadian's Oratio coram invictissimo Sigismundo Rege Poloniae. In 1517 Vietor returned to Kraków and opened his own printing shop there. His shop in Vienna was continued by his brother Benedict Büttner until 1523.

The first book printed in his new Kraków shop was Querela pacis of Erasmus of Rotterdam, which appeared on March 30, 1518. Initially, most of Vietor's prints were distributed through the bookshop of Markus Scharffenberg. In 1523 or early 1524, Vietor was granted a printing privilege for king Sigsmund's Constitution, and in 1527, he was named royal printer.

The competition in the printing business at Kraków at that time was fierce, and Vietor got into conflicts with other printers over printing rights several times. In 1527, Vietor managed to gain a printing privilege for calendars, an important income source, for ten years. After that, the privilege should fall to fellow printer Matthias Scharffenberg. When Vietor printed a calendar in 1538 all the same and Markus Scharffenberg distributed it, Matthias Scharffenberg, a relative of Marcus, took them to court, and won.

In 1536 Vietor got into conflict with the Catholic church. Vietor was a humanist, open to new ideas, and not afraid to publish works about such novelties, including new religious ideas, although he himself was never openly Protestant. He was accused and arrested for having imported and distributed "heretical" books with images that "offended" the Church. The precise history of this process is not known; in any case Vietor came out of it unscathed. It appears that he had had to reaffirm his Catholic faith before the bishop, though. (Note: Protestant prince Albrecht von Hohenzollern consulted Vietor for help in establishing a Protestant print shop at Königsberg.)

Vietor's death date is not known precisely, but it must have been between September 25, 1546 (last mention in the acts of the vicariate of Kraków) and March 21, 1547, when his wife is mentioned as a widow.

Vietor was married twice. From his first marriage to Apolonia, he had one son (Florian Vietor, died 1532). After her death, he married again; with his second wife Barbara, he had five daughters, four of which died in infancy. After Vietor's death, Barbara married his apprentice Łazarz Andrysowicz (Lazarus Andrea), who continued the business and who would become famous in his own right. Their son Jan Łazarzowicz Januszowsky (Johannes Lazarides Janussovius) would become known as a printer and writer, too.

== Works ==
Vietor was a most prolific printer: the output of his print shop in Kraków from 1518 to 1547 numbers more than 600 prints. Most of these prints were in Latin, but Vietor was also the first printer to print regularly in Polish, which accounts for 10-15% of his output. He also printed a number of multilingual works (Latin, Polish, and German). Vietor printed parts of the Bible in Polish, but also humanist works, for instance of Erasmus of Rotterdam, and a number of Polish grammars and dictionaries. Printing in Polish instead of in Latin made these works readily accessible to a much larger sector of the population.

His prints were of high quality; he possessed very good typefaces, including Greek ones, and typefaces for printing sheet music. Experts attest Vietor's prints a high level of quality, also in comparison to other European printers of the time.

== See also ==
- History of printing in Poland
- List of Polish printers

== Literature ==
- Kawecka-Gryczowa, Alodia; Mańkowska, Anna: "Wietor Hieronim", pp. 325–357 in Drukarze dawnej Polski od XV do XVIII wieku, volume I, "Malopolska", part I, "Wiek XV–XVI"; Wrocław, 1983. ISBN 8304016281.
- Świerk, Alfred: "Hieronymus Vietor (Wietor) – ein Pionier des polnischen Buchdrucks im 16. Jahrhundert", p. 194–199 in Gutenberg-Jahrbuch 51, 1976. ISSN 0072-9094.
