= Johann Haller =

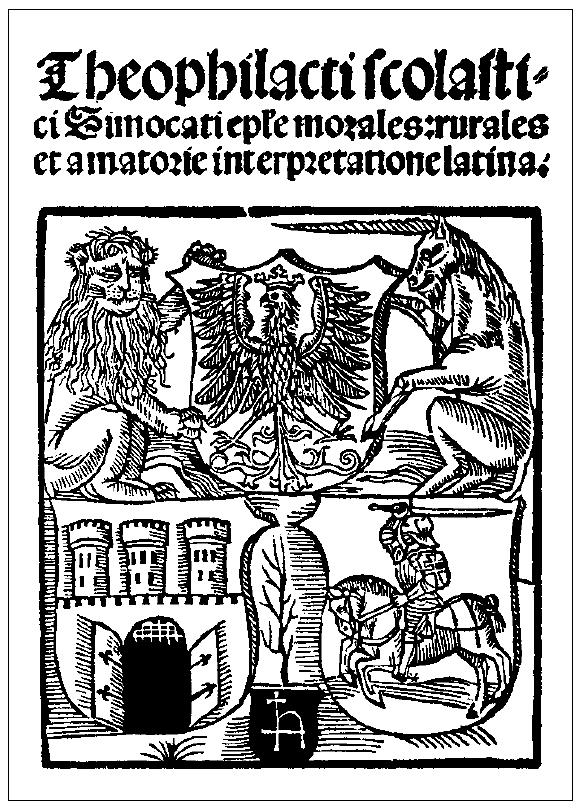
Copernicus' translation into Latin of Greek poems by Theophylact Simocatta, 1509

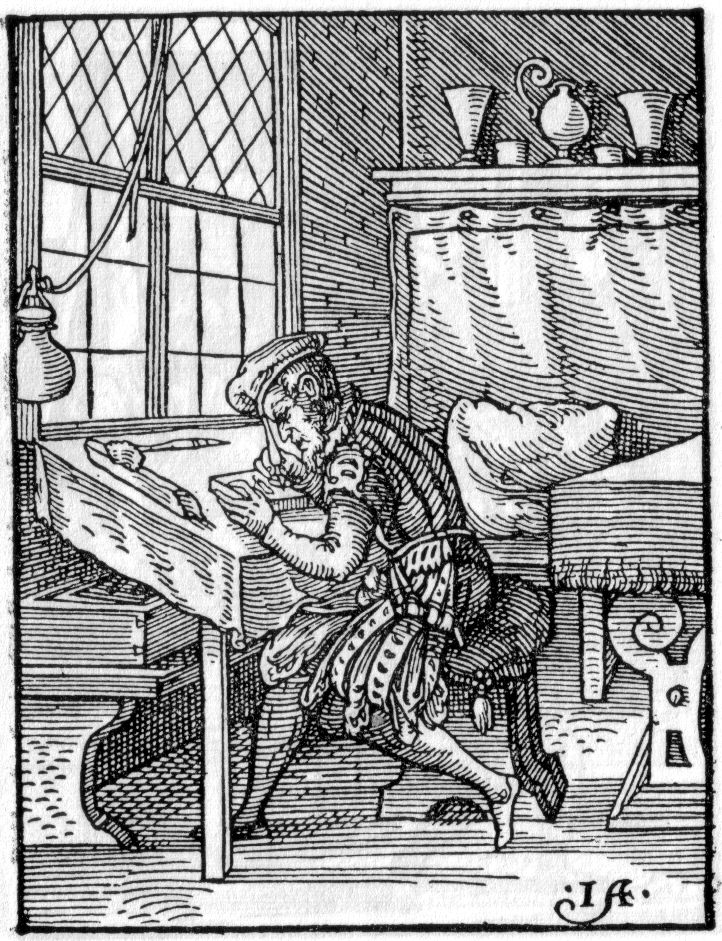
Block-cutter at work. Woodcut by Amman, 1568.

Johann Haller or Jan Haller (1463–1525) is considered one of the first commercial printers in Poland. He is known for publishing a Latin translation of poems by Theophylact Simocatta made by Nicolaus Copernicus in 1509.

== Early life ==
Haller was born in Rothenburg, Franconia, Germany. After his studies at the Kraków Academy, Haller became a merchant in wine, copper and tin.

== Printing activity ==
Haller' merchant activity enabled him to engage, at a later time, in the production of printing elements and finally establishing a printing press in Kraków. His first printing products were almanacs, followed by a breviary for the clergy. Haller acquired a partial monopoly on them, thereby protecting himself from competition. He soon expanded his business to include scientific and scholarly books in astronomy, mathematics, philosophy and law, as well as royal and church statutes.

Altogether Haller produced 3,530 prints. His masterpieces are illustrated books containing 354 sheets of woodcuts. He published the first print in Polish, Historyja umęczenia Pana naszego Jezusa Chrystusa (The Story of the Martyrdom of Our Lord Jesus Christ), in 1508.

=== Copernicus translation ===
Haller is perhaps best known for publishing in 1509 a volume of poems by Theophylact Simocatta which had been translated from Byzantine Greek into Latin by Nicolaus Copernicus, Theophilacti scolastici Simocati epistolae morales, rurales et amatoriae interpretatione latina. At the time there was no printing press in Copernicus' area—Lidzbark (Heilsberg), Frombork (Frauenburg), Toruń (Thorn)— therefore Copernicus' translation could have been printed only in Breslau (Wrocław), Kraków or farther afield. Copernicus, who had studied in Kraków, opted for Johann Haller, who together with Kasper Hochfeld had already published the first illustrated work in Poland, Jan Łaski's Statutes (1506), and one of 25 works by Laurentius Corvinus (1508). Corvinus had lectured at the Kraków Academy while Copernicus studied there, and they were well acquainted. Corvinus took a job at Thorn, but in June 1509 traveled to the printer Haller in Kraków, bringing with him the manuscript entrusted to him by Copernicus. Corvinus (Rabe) added a poem, and Copernicus wrote a dedication to his uncle, Prince-Bishop of Warmia Lucas Watzenrode. Haller published the book before the end of 1509. Its cover featured the arms of Poland, Lithuania and Kraków.

== See also ==
- List of Poles
- Printing
- Early printing in Poland
