= Helena Ungler =

Polish printer

Helena Ungler or Unglerowa (died 1551) was a Polish printer.

She was married to Florian Ungler, the owner and manager of a book printing business in Kraków. After the death of her husband in 1536, she took over the ownership and management of the printing shop until her own death. This was at the time an unusual profession for a woman, particularly in Poland.

Works printed during her tenure include:

- Żołtarz Dawida proroka (1539)
- Poncjan (1540)
- Ludycje wieśne (1543)
- Turcyki Stanisława Orzechowskiego (1543, 1544)
- Historia o żywocie Aleksandra Wielkiego (1550)

== See also ==
- List of women printers and publishers before 1800
