= Florian Ungler =

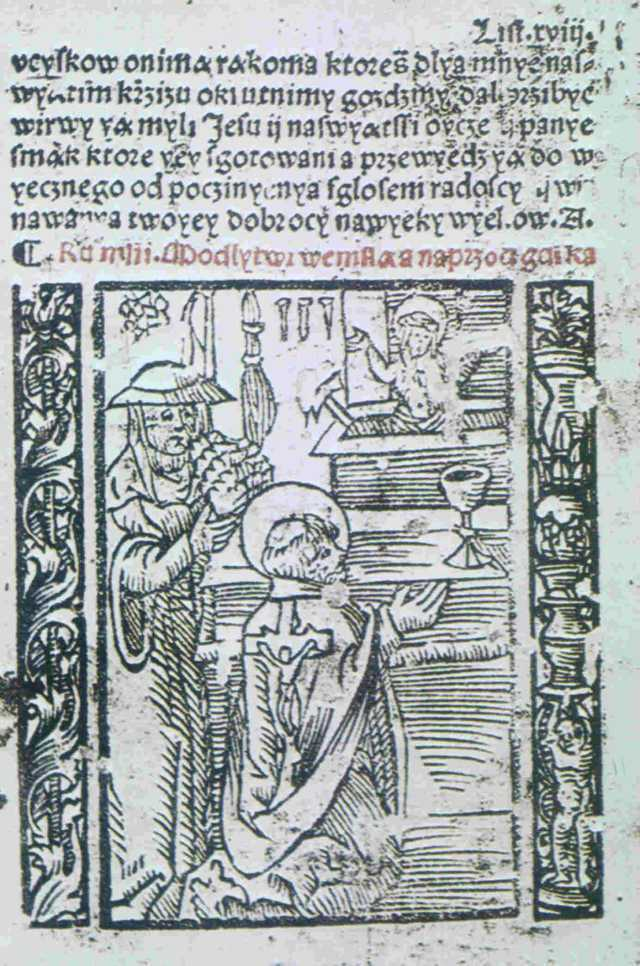
Hortulus Animae

Florian Ungler (died 1536 in Kraków) and Kasper Hochfeder were printers from Bavaria that after 1510 became pioneers of printing and publishing in the Polish language.

- 1512 Introductio in Ptolomei Cosmographiam, with maps of America
- 1513 Biernat of Lublin's Raj duszny (The Spiritual Paradise) or Hortulus Animae (literally "Garden of the Soul"), was considered the first book printed entirely in Polish. It is, in fact, the second.
- 1514 Orthographia seu modus recte scribendi et legendi Polonicum idioma quam utilissimus, the first Grammar of Polish language

After having published about 80 works of high quality, he had to close his shop, working for his competitor Johann Haller for some time. From 1521 onwards, he worked again in a new shop of his own, publishing 160 works until his death in 1536, after which his wife Helena Ungler continued until 1551.

== See also ==
- Incunabula
- Johannes Gutenberg
- Movable type
- Printing
- Early printing in Poland
- Spread of the printing press
