= Tochowicz =

Tochowicz is a Polish surname. Notable people with the surname include:

- Leon Tochowicz (1897–1965), Polish physician and cardiologist
- Stanisław Tochowicz (1923–1994), Polish metallurgist
