= Hanna Helena Chrzanowska =

Polish Roman Catholic and nurse

Blessed Hanna Helena Chrzanowska OblOSB
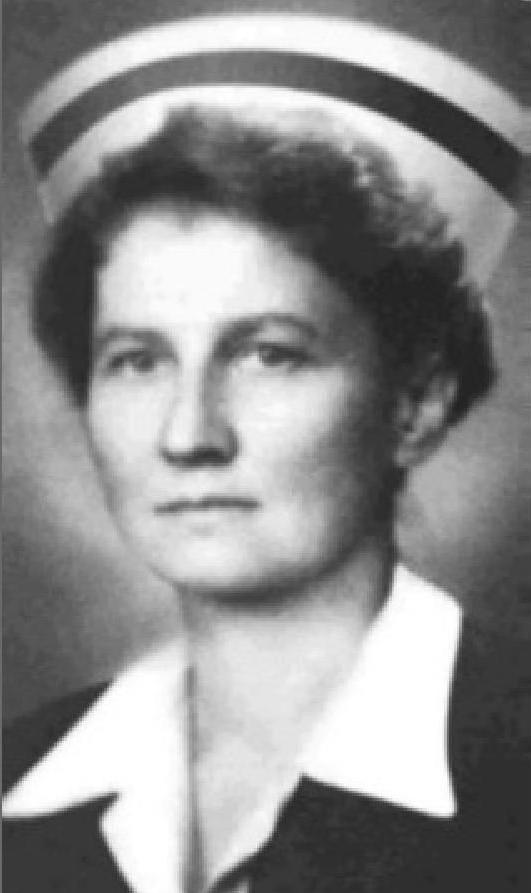
- Chrzanowska c. 1945

Virgin
- Born: 7 October 1902; Warsaw, Congress Poland, Russian Empire
- Died: 29 April 1973 (aged 70); Kraków, Polish People's Republic
- Resting place: Rakowicki Cemetery, Kraków
- Venerated in: Roman Catholic Church
- Beatified: 28 April 2018, Divine Mercy Sanctuary, Kraków, Poland by Cardinal Angelo Amato
- Canonized: 28 October 2018
- Feast: 29 April

Hanna Helena Chrzanowska (7 October 1902 – 29 April 1973), sometimes anglicized as Hannah Helen Chrzanowska, was a Polish Roman Catholic who served as a nurse and was also a Benedictine oblate. Chrzanowska worked as a nurse during World War II when the Nazi regime targeted Poles, but she tended to the wounded and the ailing throughout the conflict and sought to minimize suffering in her own parish. Chrzanowska was awarded two prestigious Polish awards for her good works and died in 1973 after an almost decade-long bout of cancer.

Her cause of beatification commenced over a decade after her death; on its beginning on 28 April 1997, she was titled as a Servant of God. Pope Francis declared her as venerable on 30 September 2015 upon the confirmation of her heroic virtue and later approved her beatification in mid-2017; Chrzanowska was beatified on 28 April 2018 in Poland.

== Life ==
Hanna Helena Chrzanowska was born on 7 October 1902 in Warsaw to Ignacy Chrzanowski (1866–1940) and Wanda Szlenkier. She was part of an industrialist (maternal side) and a land-owning household (paternal side) that maintained a long-standing tradition of charitable works; her parents were well known for this in their native Poland. Her home's religious circumstances were also quite unique since half were Roman Catholic and the other half was Protestant (descended from the Jauch house). Chrzanowska was a relative of the Nobel laureate Henryk Sienkiewicz (on her father's side) who was best known for writing the novel Quo Vadis.

Her maternal grandfather Karol set up a technical school for aspiring artisans while his wife Maria set up a health center for poor children in Warsaw. Her maternal aunt Zofia Szlenkier was known for her philanthropic efforts and in 1913 founded a children's hospital named after Maria and Karol. Zofia became a director of the Warsaw School of Nursing.

Since her childhood she suffered from respiratory and immune system deficiencies and spent a great deal of time in hospitals and sanatoriums in order to recover from such ailments. As a child she once noticed a boy alongside her in hospital whose clothes were so worn out to the point they were thrown out. But that meant the boy had no clothes he could wear to return home. So she arranged to present him with a new set of clothes much to his delight. In 1910 the family relocated from Warsaw to Kraków.

Chrzanowska first studied privately, and then at the Ursuline high school and graduated with honors. Having left school she enrolled in a Red Cross course in order to help nurse victims of the Polish-Bolshevik war. She later commenced her studies at the School of Nursing in Warsaw in 1920, under a grant from the Rockefeller Foundation. Sometime in the 1920s she suffered an arm injury and was required to have an operation. It was also around this stage that she worked under Magdalena Maria Epstein. Before she was admitted into nursing school she volunteered at a clinic for six months but was assigned bookkeeping duties that did not appeal to her for she wanted to be with people.

She gained another scholarship to a nursing school in France in 1925 while later going on to work with the members of the U.S. Red Cross as a nurse in a time when the profession was not so well respected. Chrzanowska also traveled to Belgium to observe the nursing profession there as part of her education so as to gain greater experience and broader knowledge of the field. During her time as a nurse, she became a leading light in the field in her region and became a well-known face in her local area due to her temperance and her good works amongst the people whom she was dedicated to serving. Chrzanowska became an instructor at the University School of Nurses and Hygienists in Kraków from 1926 until 1929 and also served as the editor of the monthly publication Nurse Poland from 1929 to 1939. She also worked to help form the Catholic Association of Polish Nurses in 1937.

Prior to the outbreak of World War II Hanna had moved to Warsaw and had been offered the position of vice principal of the School of Nursing in Warsaw. In 1940 during World War II she lost her father who died during the Sonderaktion Krakau at the Sachsenhausen concentration camp and her lieutenant brother Bogden, an officer in the Polish Reserves, was murdered by the Soviets in Katyn. In 1939 she returned to Krakow to work with the Polish Welfare Committee. As the war continued she organized nurses for home care in Warsaw and helped to both feed and resettle refugees. She secretly co-ordinated foster care for orphaned and other children, including Jewish children, separated from their parents with families and congregations of sisters who ran orphanages.

At the conclusion of the war, she started working at the University School of Nursing and Midwifery as the head of the social nursing department. Chrzanowska also served as the director of the School of Psychiatric Nursing in Kobierzyn until the communists closed it. After sometime she moved into nursing the poor and the neglected in her own parish area. She became a member of the Benedictine oblate at Tyniec Abbey due to being drawn to Benedict of Nursia; she also wanted to fuse her faith with her work as merciful and charitable work. From 1946 until 1947 Chrzanowska received a scholarship to the United States of America, where she deepened her knowledge in the field of home nursing. In 1957 she organized a nurses' pilgrimage to Jasna Góra. She published professional articles in nursing journals. Cardinal Karol Wojtyła nominated her for a Pro Ecclesia et Pontifice award.

In 1966 she was diagnosed with cancer and despite several operations (one being on 13 December 1966) the disease spread. Franciszek Macharski visited her on 12 April 1973 and gave her the Anointing of the Sick while she later lost consciousness on 28 April. Chrzanowska succumbed to the disease on 29 April 1973 in her apartment at 4:00 am and the cardinal archbishop of Kraków Karol Józef Wojtyła – the future Pope John Paul II – celebrated her funeral. On 6 April 2016 her remains were exhumed for examination and were reburied on 7 April at a celebration that Cardinal Macharski presided over.

== Honors ==
Pro Ecclesia et Pontifice.

Order of Polonia Restituta.

Chrzanowska received three prestigious honors in her lifetime in recognition of her good works:

- Odznaka honorowa „Za wzorową pracę w służbie zdrowia” (1957)
- the Pro Ecclesia et Pontifice medal – received in 1965
- the Order of Polonia Restituta (Knight's Cross) – received in 1971

== Beatification ==
In 1995, nurses from the Catholic Association of Nurses and Midwives asked Fr. Cardinal F. Macharski to initiate the beatification process. The beatification process commenced in Poland on 28 April 1997 when the Congregation for the Causes of Saints granted their assent to the cause. The C.C.S. validated the local process sometime later on 11 January 2008. The Positio was presented to Rome for further evaluation in 2011 and Pope Francis recognized that she had lived a life of heroic virtue thus proclaimed her to be Venerable on 30 September 2015.

The next step was for a miracle to be attributed to her for her beatification. One such case was investigated in Kraków and was validated in Rome on 21 May 2010. Pope Francis confirmed this miracle in mid-2017, and she was beatified in Poland on 28 April 2018.

The current postulator for this cause is Father Antoni Sołtysik.
