= Siedlecki =

Siedlecki (feminine: Siedlecka; plural: Siedleccy) is a Polish surname (toponymic adjective of Siedlce). It may refer to:

- Jack Siedlecki (born 1951), American football coach
- Joanna Siedlecka (born 1949), Polish writer
- Michał Marian Siedlecki (1873–1940), Polish zoologist
- Zygmunt Siedlecki (1907–1977), Polish athlete
- RV Profesor Siedlecki, Polish research ship
