= Kazimierz Lepszy =

Polish historian (1904–1964)

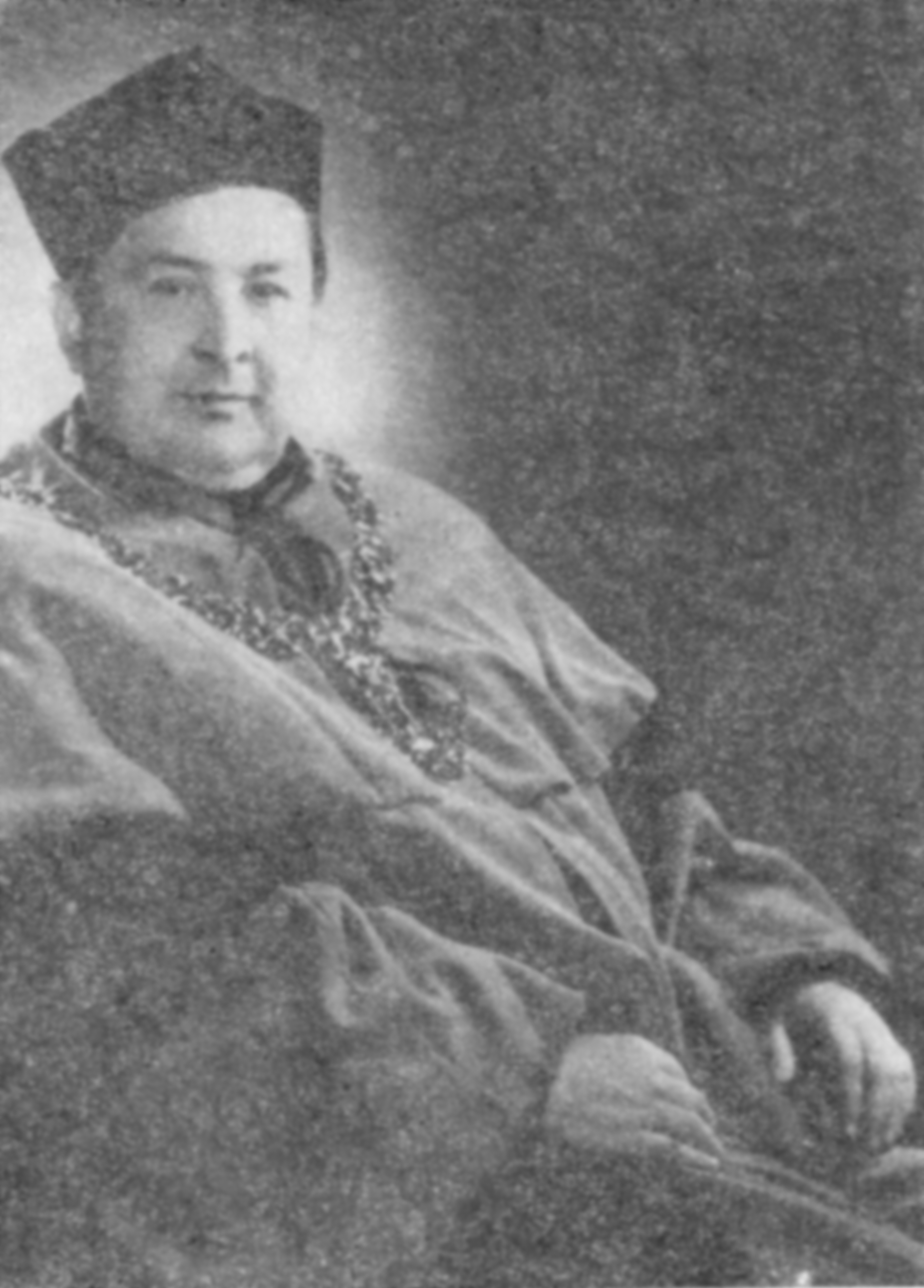
- Born: 11 June 1904; Kraków
- Died: 30 May 1964 (aged 59); Kraków
- Occupation: Historian

Academic background
- Education: Jagiellonian University

Kazimierz Lepszy (11 June 1904 – 30 May 1964) was a historian, professor and rector of the Jagiellonian University, member of Sejm, member of the Polish Academy of Arts and Sciences and editor of the Polish Biographical Dictionary.

== Biography ==
He studied at the Jagiellonian University, there his teachers included: Wacław Sobieski, Stanisław Kot, Władysław Konopczyński and Ignacy Chrzanowski.

He was arrested by the Nazis during Sonderaktion Krakau. From 1945 until 1946 he was, together with Roman Grodecki, the editor of Kwartalnik Historyczny.

== Works ==
- Oblężenie Krakowa przez arcyksięcia Maksymiliana. 1929.
- Prusy Książęce a Polska w latach 1576–1578. 1932.
- Kraków i ziemia krakowska. 1934. Co-authored with Józef Feldman and Roman Grodecki.
- Strażnicy morza Stefana Batorego. 1934.
- „Dominium maris Baltici” Zygmunta Augusta. 1946.
- Dzieje floty polskiej. 1947.
- Zarys dziejów marynarki polskiej. 1947.
- Jan Zamoyski – wróg Habsburgów (z problematyki monografii o kanclerzu). 1949.
- Organizacja sił zbrojnych na morzu za Zygmunta III. 1952.
- Andrzej Frycz-Modrzewski. 1953.
- Podłoże społeczno-gospodarcze Odrodzenia w Krakowie. 1954.
- Geneza i program społeczny radykalnego nurtu Braci Polskich. 1956. Co-authored with Anna Kamińska.
- Walka sejmowa o konfederację warszawską w roku 1587. 1959.

=== Editions ===
- Polska w okresie drugiej wojny północnej, 1655–1660. 1957.
- Dzieje UJ w latach 1364–1764 / L'Université Jagellonne d'hier, d'aujourd'hui et de demain / Jagiellonian University of Cracow: Past, Present and Future. 1964.
- Studia z dziejów młodzieży Uniwersytetu Krakowskiego w dobie Renesansu. 1964.

== Accolades ==
- Knight's Cross of the Order of Polonia Restituta (28 September 1954)
- Medal of the 10th Anniversary of People's Poland (15 January 1955)
- Order of the Banner of Labour, 1st class (9 May 1964)

== Bibliography ==
- Urban, Wacław (1964). "Kazimierz Lepszy (11.IV.1904–30.V.1964)". Małopolskie Studia Historyczne. 1/2: 148–151.
