= Bible translations by Władysław Szczepański =

Polish Catholic Bible translations of the Gospels and Acts

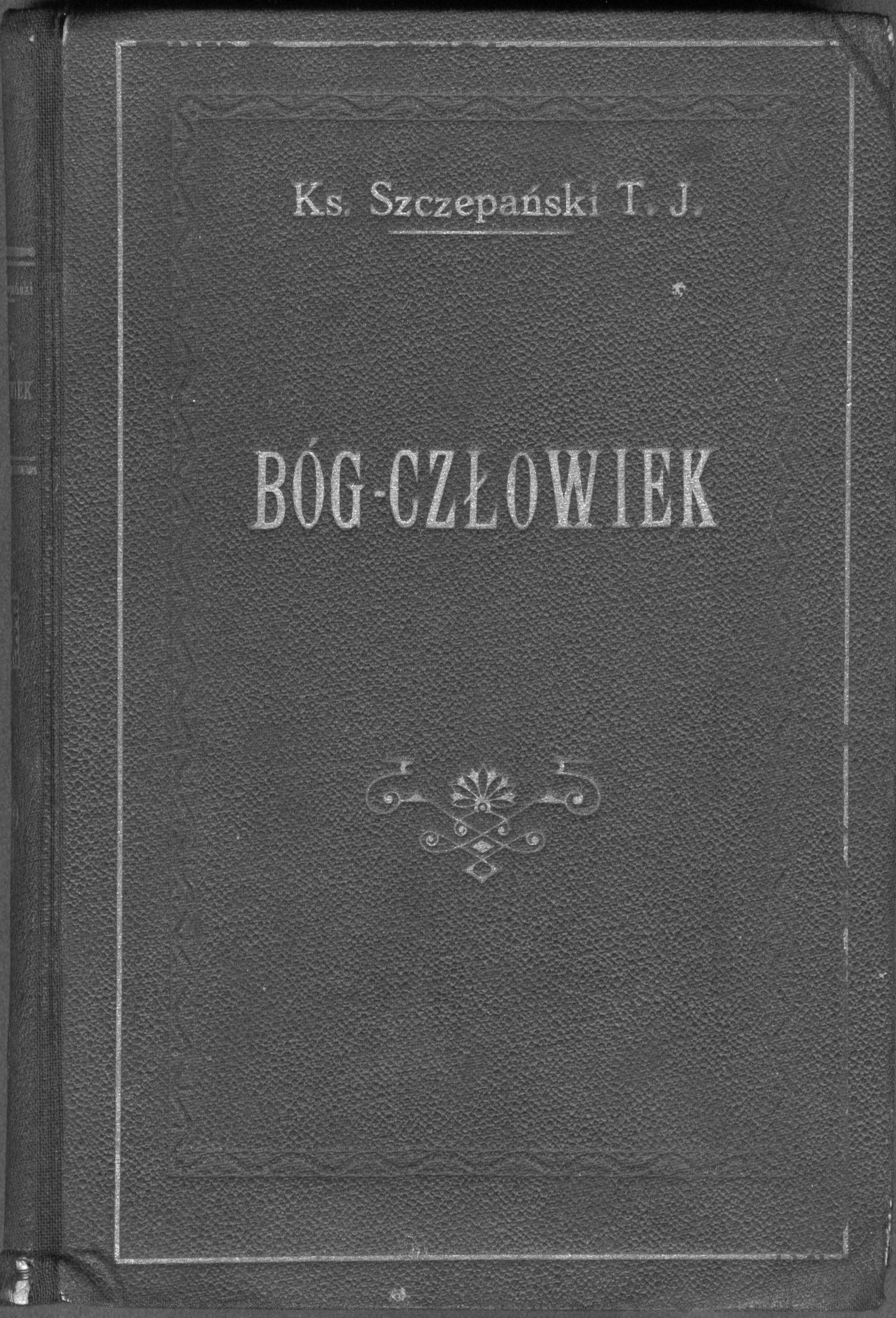
- Cover of Bóg-Człowiek w opisie Ewangelistów
- Full name: Bóg-Człowiek w opisie Ewangelistów; Cztery Ewangelie. Wstęp, nowy przekład i komentarz Nowy Testament (I. Ewangelie i Dzieje Apostolskie) (English: God-Man as Described by the Evangelists; Four Gospels: Introduction, New Translation, and Commentary; New Testament (I. Gospels and Acts of the Apostles))
- Language: Polish
- Authorship: Władysław Szczepański
- Derived from: Original texts, Vulgate
- Textual basis: 1917 (Gospels and Acts of the Apostles)
- Religious affiliation: Catholic Church
- John 3:16 For God so loved the world that He gave His only begotten Son, that whoever believes in Him should not perish but have eternal life.

Bible translations by Władysław Szczepański encompass the Gospels and the Acts of the Apostles, published between 1914 and 1917. These were the first Polish Catholic translations of the New Testament directly from Greek, while also considering the Vulgate.

The translator, Jesuit Władysław Szczepański, was an archaeologist, biblical scholar, and professor at the Pontifical Gregorian University in Rome and the University of Warsaw. His translations diverged from the Jakub Wujek Bible, employing modern translation principles such as fidelity to the source texts and textual criticism.

== Editions ==
=== Bóg-Człowiek w opisie Ewangelistów (1914) ===
Szczepański described this publication in its subtitle as a "new, synoptic translation of the four Gospels into one, based on the Greek text with explanations". The translation followed the structure of a Gospel harmony. He used the Gospel of John as the foundation, aligning its chronology of Jewish feasts, and integrated events from Luke and Mark, supplemented by Matthew's Gospel. He structured Jesus' public ministry over three years. The genealogies of Christ from Matthew and Luke were included in an appendix.

The translation was accompanied by a commentary providing exegetical, dogmatic, philological, geographical, and archaeological insights.

The first edition, published in Rome in 1914, was an illustrated, large-format album. It included a foreword by Archbishop Józef Bilczewski. Subsequent editions, with reduced commentary and smaller formats, were published in Kraków in 1924, 1936, and 1950.

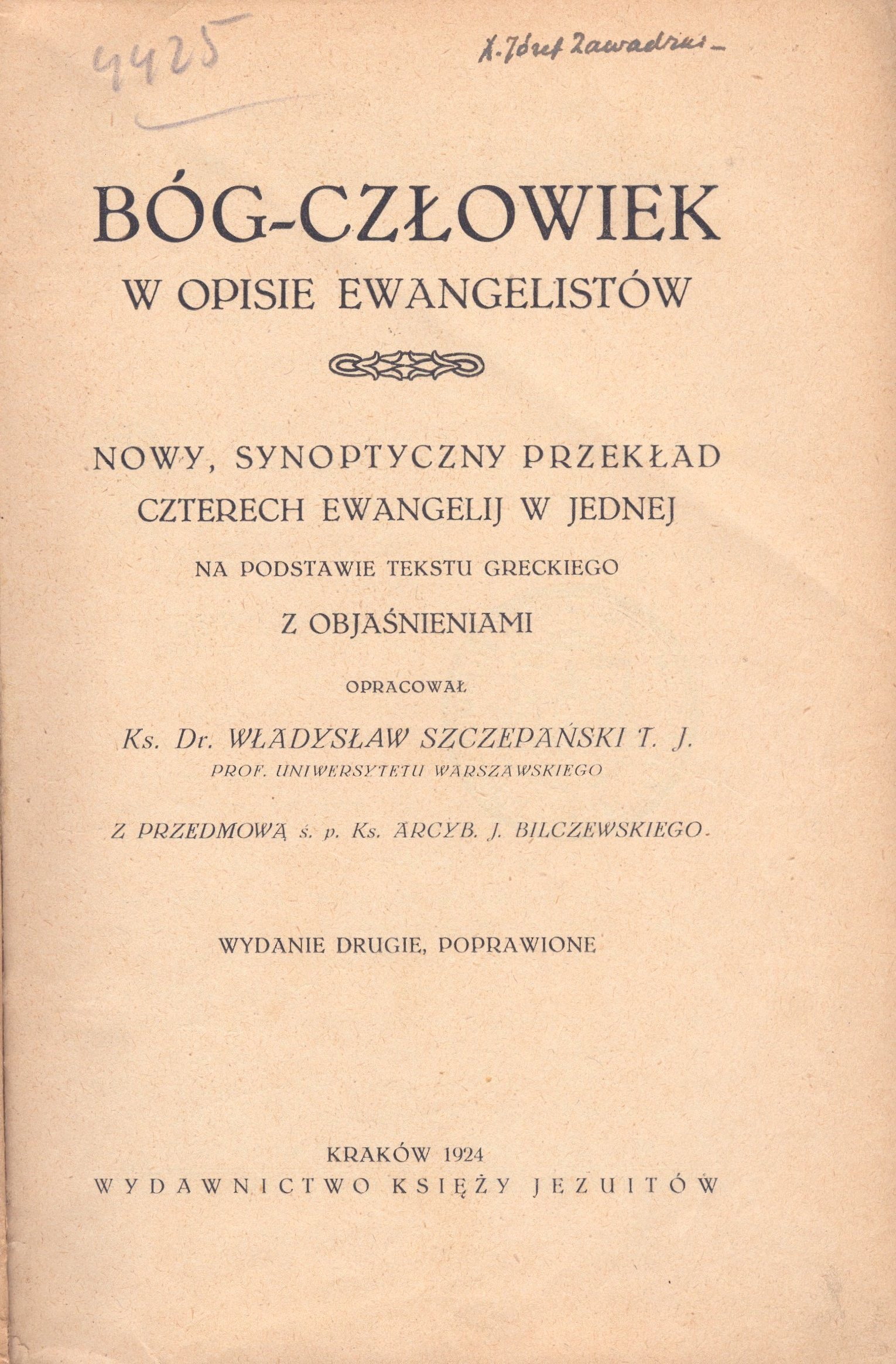
Title page of the 1924 edition

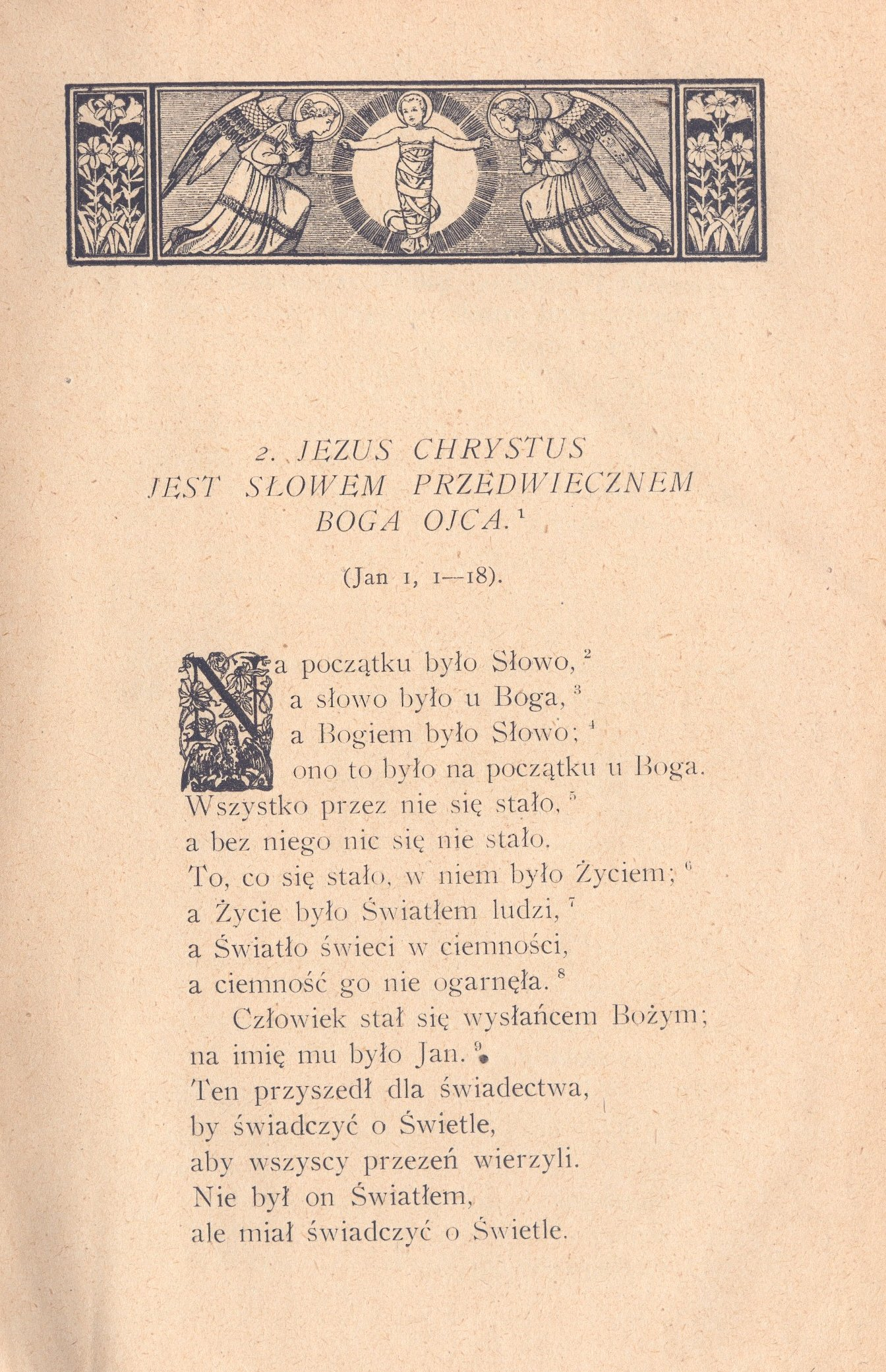
Prologue of the Gospel of John

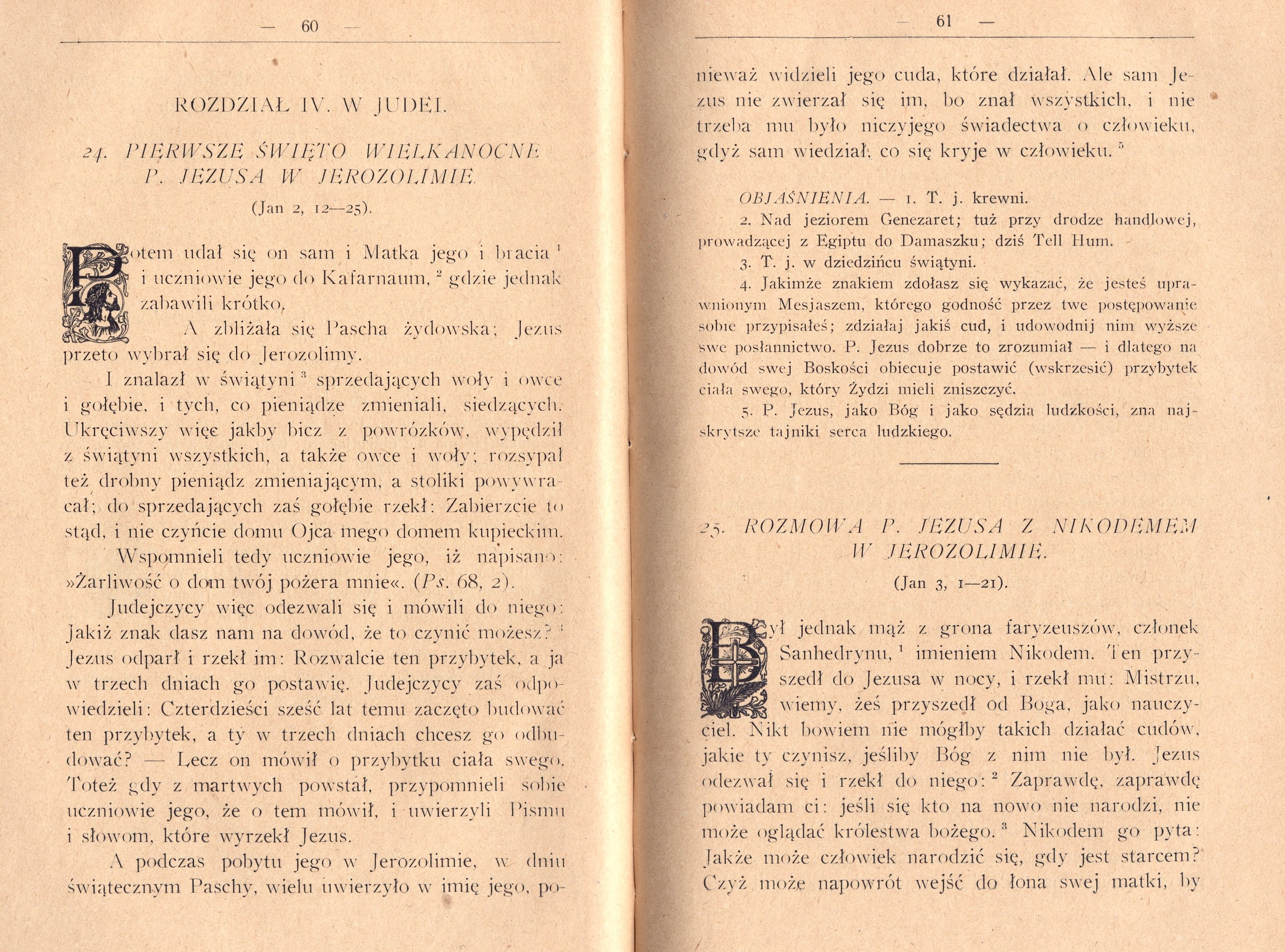
Second chapter of the Gospel of John

=== Cztery Ewangelie (1917) ===
Following the Gospel harmony Bóg-Człowiek, Szczepański continued his translation work. He translated the four canonical Gospels individually and sent them to theologians and biblical scholars for review. Their feedback was thoroughly considered and incorporated into the final edition.

Cztery Ewangelie consisted of two parts. The first, Wstęp ogólny do Ewangelii (General Introduction to the Gospels), covered the geography, history, and religious and social conditions of ancient Palestine. The historical reliability and dating of the Gospels were addressed in line with the decisions of the Pontifical Biblical Commission. The second part, Przekład i Komentarz (Translation and Commentary), included the translation with notations for textual variants and parallel passages, alongside an expanded philological-historical commentary compared to Bóg-Człowiek. The title page indicated that Cztery Ewangelie was intended as the first part of a New Testament translation, but subsequent parts were not published.

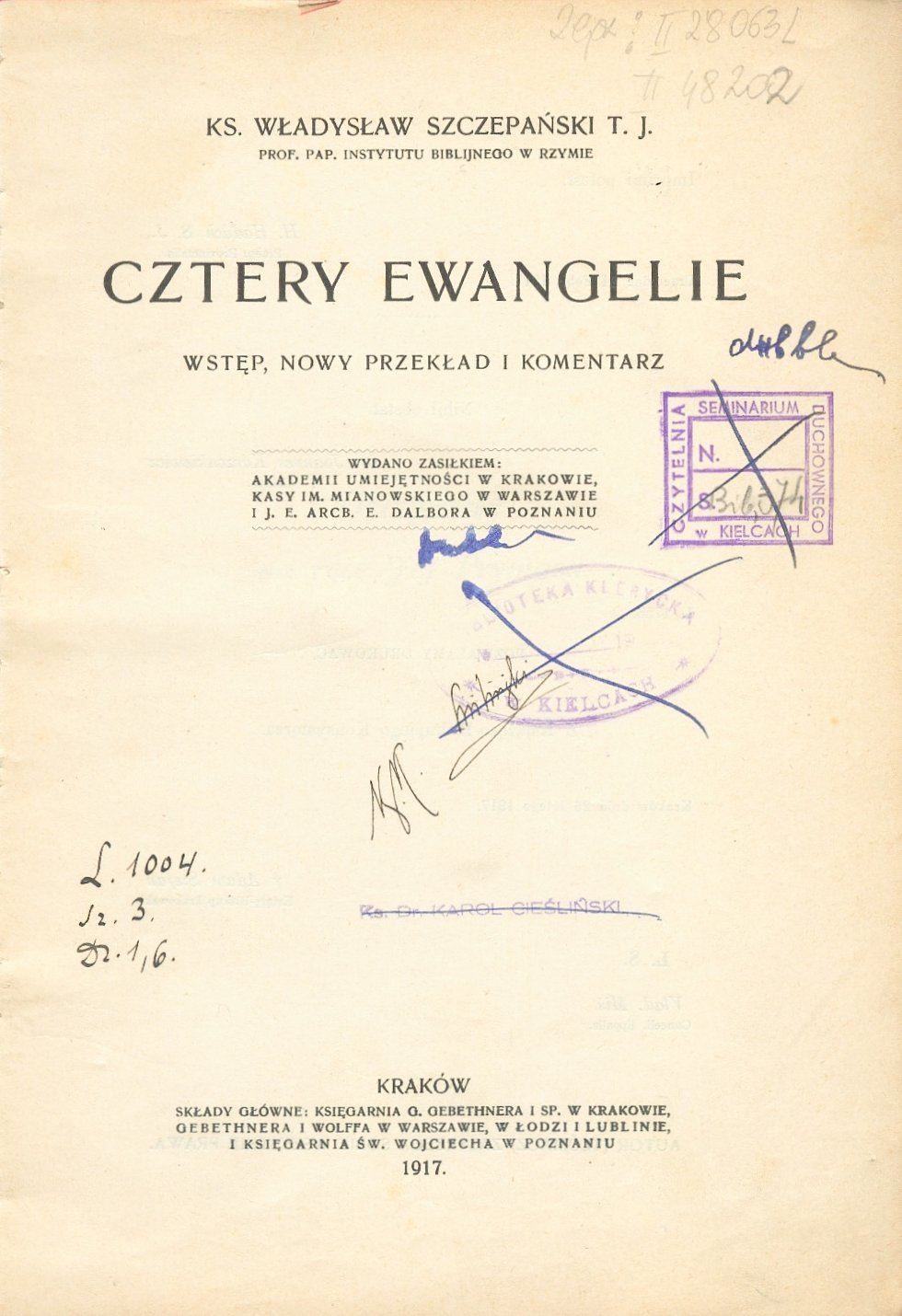
Title page

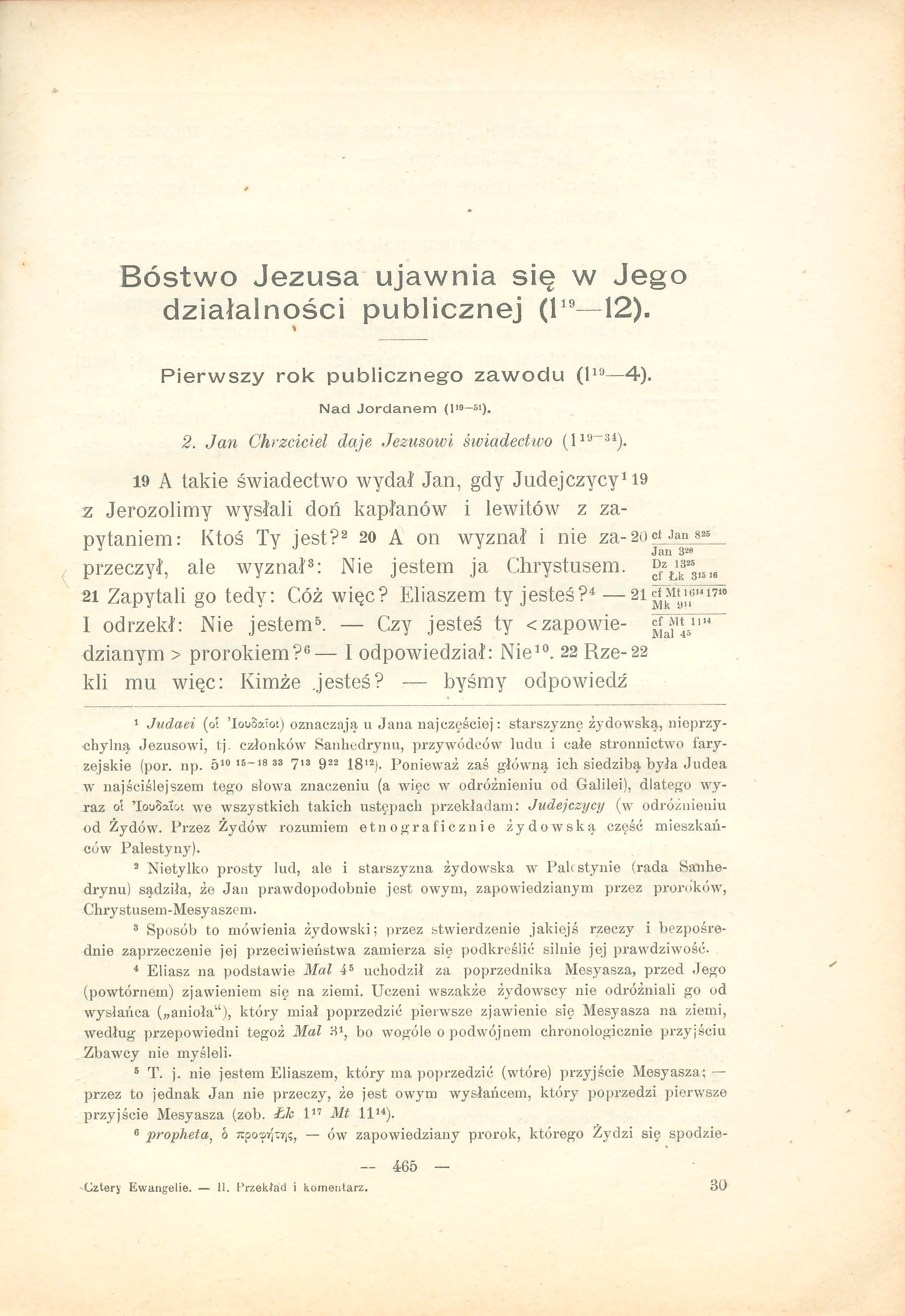
Excerpt from the Gospel of John

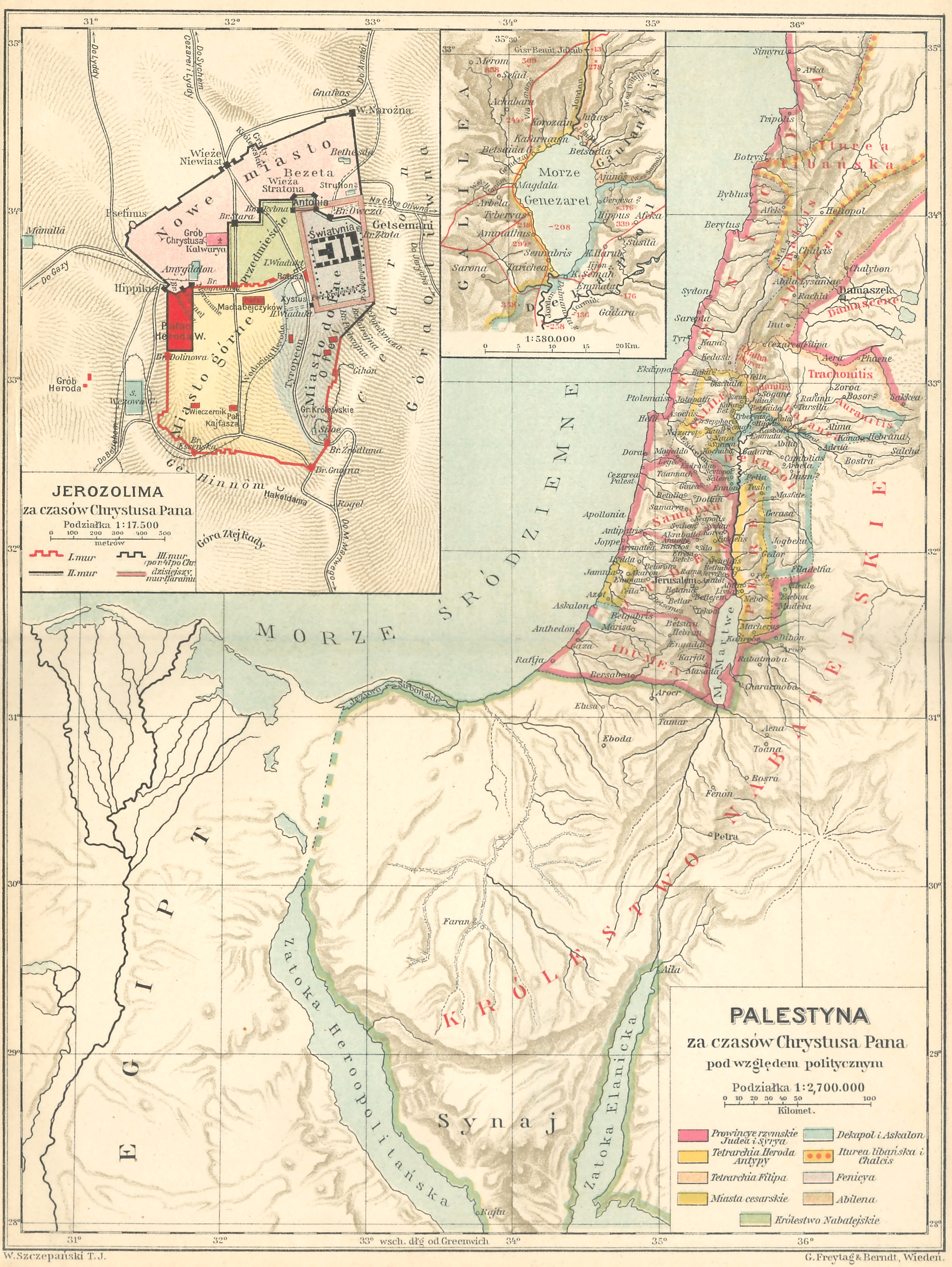
Map of Palestine, Jerusalem, and the Sea of Galilee area

=== Gospels and Acts of the Apostles (1917) ===
A translation combining the Gospels and the Acts of the Apostles was also published in 1917 in Kraków. Compared to Cztery Ewangelie, it was in a smaller format with abbreviated commentary. Later editions included the Acts of the Apostles alone (Poznań, 1922) and the Gospels and Acts in five volumes (Poznań, 1925).

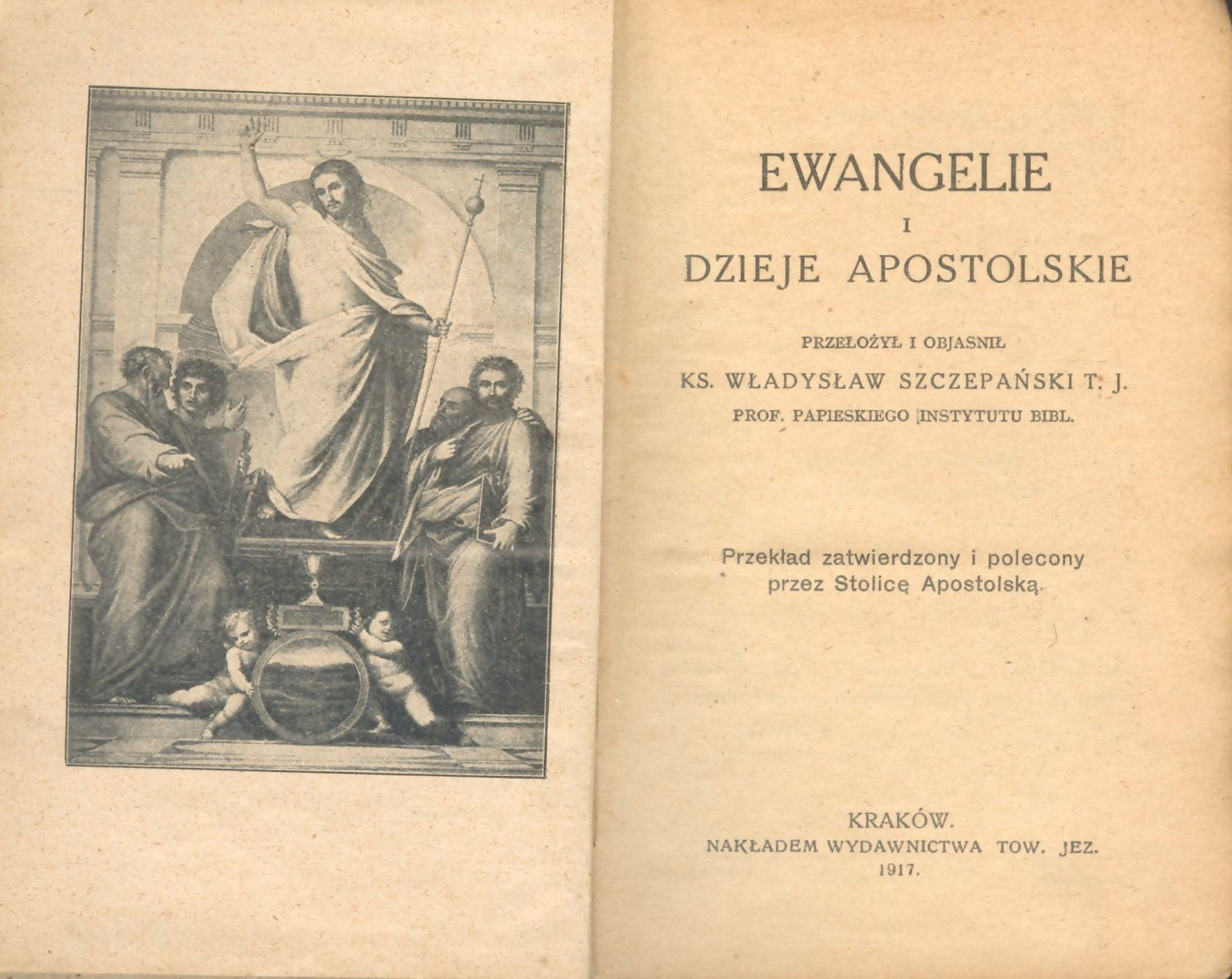
Title page

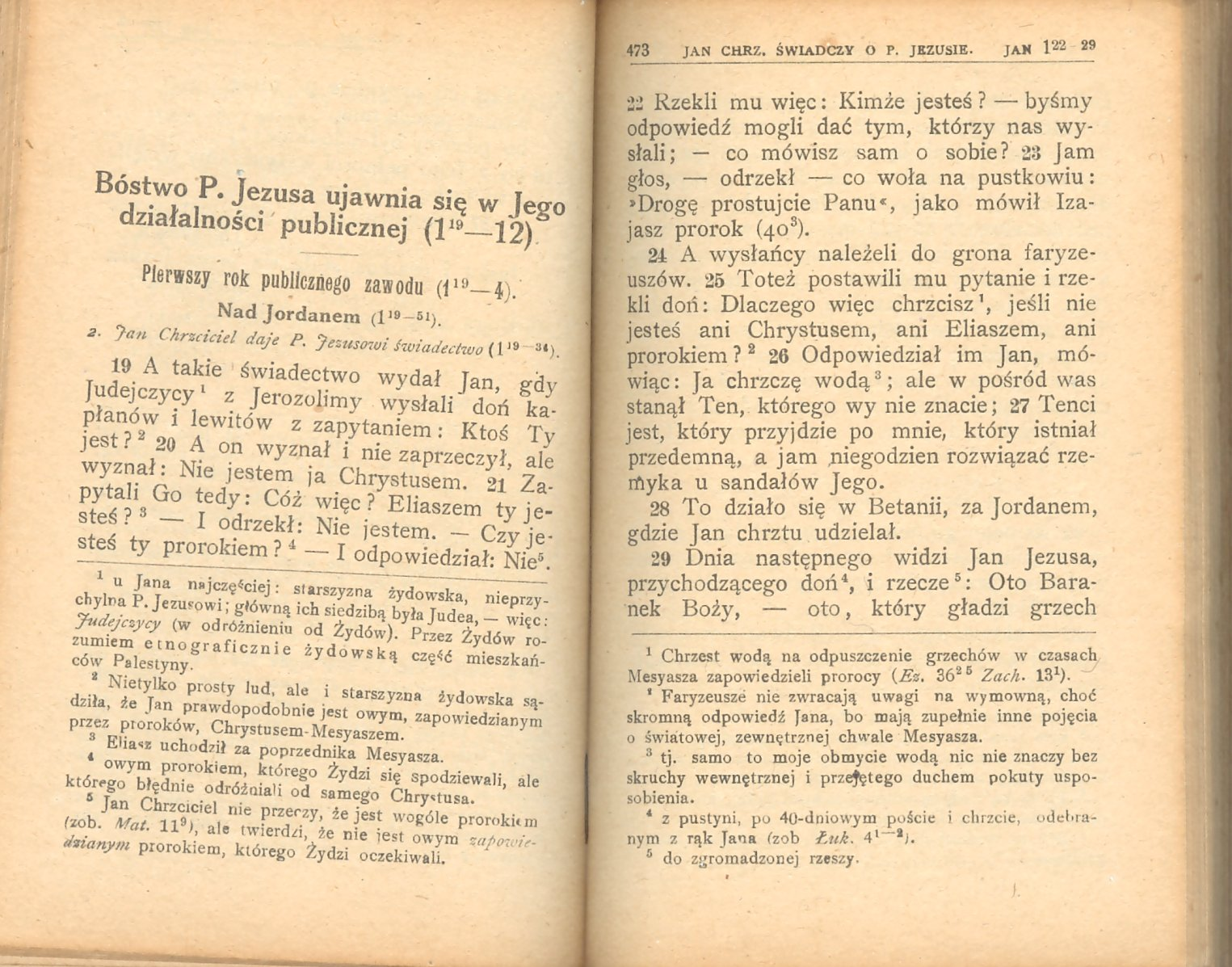
Excerpt from the Gospel of John

== Source texts ==
Szczepański's translations were described as being based on the original languages, but he noted: "For ecclesiastical reasons, it was necessary to keep the Vulgate, recognized by the Council of Trent as the official, authentic text of the Roman Church, in view alongside the Greek text". Consequently, he considered both the Greek text and the Vulgate:

- Additions unique to the Vulgate (distinguishing its editions) and words exclusive to the Greek text were marked separately.
- Where the Greek text differed from the Vulgate in ways that could not be reflected in the translation, the Greek variants were noted in the commentary.

For the Vulgate, Szczepański used:

- The Sixto-Clementine Vulgate, edited by A. Gramatica in 1914 (the official ecclesiastical edition).
- Novum Testamentum Latine, edited by John Wordsworth and H. J. White (1889–1905).

For the Greek text, he primarily relied on Hermann von Soden's 1913 reconstruction, which also provided the critical apparatus.

== Translation characteristics ==
Szczepański outlined his translation principles in a preface to the 1917 Cztery Ewangelie, emphasizing novelty, fidelity, and criticality.

His translation was entirely new and independent of the Jakub Wujek Bible, though he retained phrases deeply ingrained in Polish culture, almost proverbial in nature. Occasionally, he used archaisms to highlight solemn passages. Unlike earlier translations, he emulated the simplicity of biblical narrative style, reflecting feedback from biblical scholars and theologians.

Fidelity, for Szczepański, meant accurately reflecting every biblical sentence and word. However, he avoided overly literal translations, not preserving the original word order or using expressions unique to ancient languages (Hebraisms, Grecisms, or Latinisms). He aimed to preserve the stylistic distinctiveness of each author, noting that Luke's style was the easiest to translate, while Mark's, with its incomplete sentences and tense shifts, posed the greatest challenge. Archbishop Józef Bilczewski, in his 1913 introduction to Bóg-Człowiek, praised the translation as "faithful but not slavish; the language noble and simple".

A distinguishing feature was the synoptic approach, ensuring consistent translation of identical phrases across the Synoptic Gospels. Szczepański argued this eliminated apparent textual contradictions absent in the original Greek, unlike the Vulgate or other ancient and modern translations. Where the Greek text was ambiguous, he preserved that ambiguity to allow for dual exegesis, such as in Luke 2:49.

Criticality involved aligning with advances in textual criticism from the late 19th and early 20th centuries.

== Reception ==
Supporters praised the clarity and thoroughness of his introduction and commentary. Józef Teslar, reviewing the Four Gospels in 1917, noted that the translation underwent three revisions, with initial critiques addressed in the final version. He described the text as "clear, comprehensible, yet imbued with sacred gravity and reverence", capturing the individual styles of the Gospel authors. Comparing passages from Matthew's Gospel to the Greek original, Teslar argued that Szczepański's work resolved ambiguities present in the Jakub Wujek Bible. He expressed hope that Szczepański would translate the entire Bible.

Fragments of Szczepański's translation were incorporated into lectionaries and Gospel Books used for Mass readings in some dioceses, such as those compiled by Rudolf Tomanek (Cieszyn, 1930). These were popular, as noted by critics. The Jesuit Publishing House's commentary on the second edition of Bóg-Człowiek emphasized that it initiated "the much-needed and widely desired translation of individual books of Scripture based on the originals" in Poland.

Comparisons with the Jakub Wujek Bible, favored by those advocating for its revision rather than a new translation, were less favorable. In 1920, Ignacy Chrzanowski published a pamphlet, Nowy przekład polski Pisma Świętego (New Polish Translation of the Holy Scriptures), which critiqued Szczepański's style in what was later described as a "somewhat aggressive" manner. Chrzanowski acknowledged the language as generally correct but pointed out linguistic errors, Latinisms, and Germanisms. For instance, he criticized the phrase "We have no king but Caesar" (John 19:15) as a slavish translation of the Latin Non habemus regem, nisi Caesarem. He argued that where Szczepański followed Wujek, the translation was correct, but his innovations were often "dry, lacking poetry, and even commonplace or banal".

In 1948, Artur Chojecki referenced Chrzanowski's critique in the journal Znak, suggesting that future Bible translators, including Eugeniusz Dąbrowski and Feliks Gryglewicz, should study it, as they had not.

Contemporary scholars highlight the novelty of Szczepański's approach. Bożena Szczepińska noted that he advocated, as early as the early 20th century, for preserving the ambiguities of the original text in translation. Marian Wolniewicz emphasized that "Szczepański provided the most comprehensive set of translation principles, a framework for a theory of biblical translation".

== Bibliography ==
- Szczepański, Władysław (1917). "Przedmowa" [Preface]. Cztery Ewangelie. Wstęp, Nowy przekład i komentarz [Four Gospels: Introduction, New Translation, and Commentary] (in Polish). Kraków: Księgarnia G. Gebethnera.
