= Sternbach =

Sternbach is a surname. Notable people with the surname include:

- Joni Sternbach, American photographer
- June Sternbach (born 1995), American social media personality
- Leo Sternbach, chemist
- Leon Sternbach, philologist
- Ludwik Sternbach, Indologist
- Rick Sternbach, illustrator
