= Bogusław Leśnodorski =

Polish historian, professor, and author

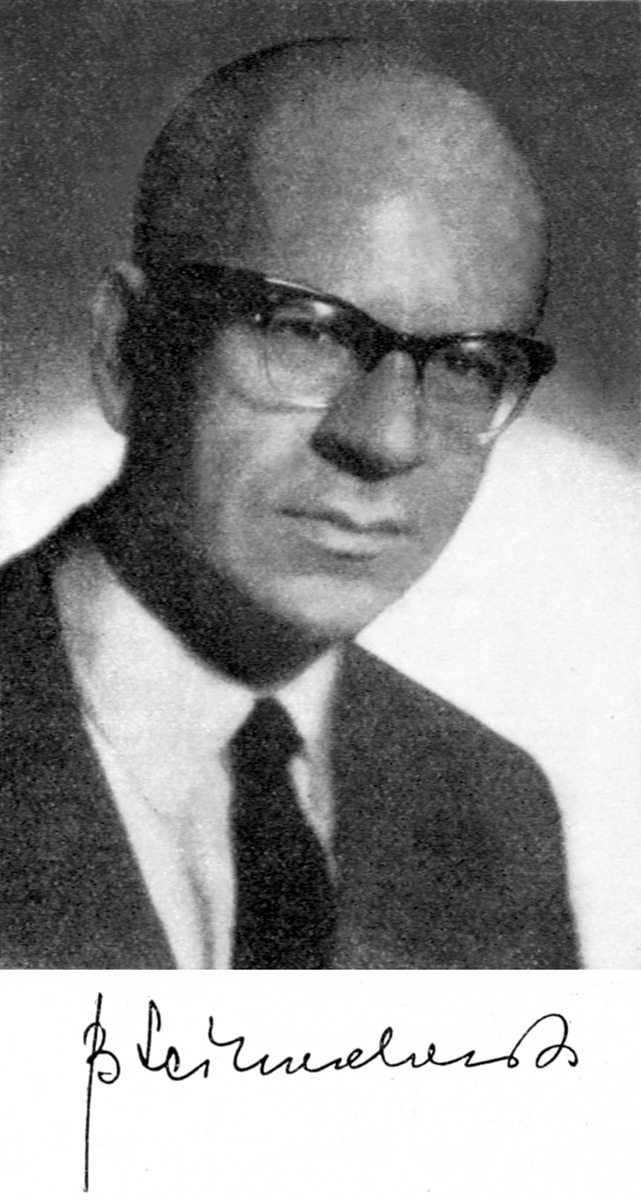

Bogusław Leśnodorski (27 May 1914 – 1 July 1985) was a Polish historian, professor of the University of Warsaw and author of many books and articles.

== Biography ==
He was born on 27 May 1914 in Kraków, as the son of Maria née Owińska and Gustaw Leśnodorski. In 1932 he graduated from the III Jan Sobieski Gymnasium in Kraków, the school where his father had taught. He studied at the Faculty of Law of the Jagiellonian University, graduating in 1936, where he began work in the Department of the History of the Polish System. In 1938 he completed his doctorate, with Stanisław Kutrzeba as his promoter.

In November 1939 he was imprisoned as part of the German operation Sonderaktion Krakau. He suffered a stay in the Sachsenhausen and Dachau German concentration camps. He was released in February 1940 and was involved in secret teaching at Jagiellonian University.

In 1947 he received his habilitation on the basis of his academic achievements and his dissertation Dzieło Sejmu Czteroletniego. From 1950 he taught at the Faculty of Law at the University of Warsaw as an associate professor, and from 1958 as a full professor. From 1965 to 1968 he was dean of the Faculty of Law and Administration at the University of Warsaw. Since 1973 he was a correspondent member of the Polish Academy of Sciences. In 1966 he received an honorary doctorate from the University of Toulouse. In June 1968, he was a member of the Preparatory Committee for the celebration of the 500th anniversary of Nicolaus Copernicus' birth.

His main area of research was the Polish Enlightenment. Among other books, he published Polscy jakobini, Rozmowy z przeszłością. Dziesięć wieków Polski.

He died on 1 July 1985 in Warsaw. He was buried at Rakowicki Cemetery on 8 July 1985.

== Personal life ==
He was married and had a daughter and a son. He was the grandfather of Bogusław Leśnodorski, a lawyer and the chairman of Legia Warsaw from 2012 to 2017.

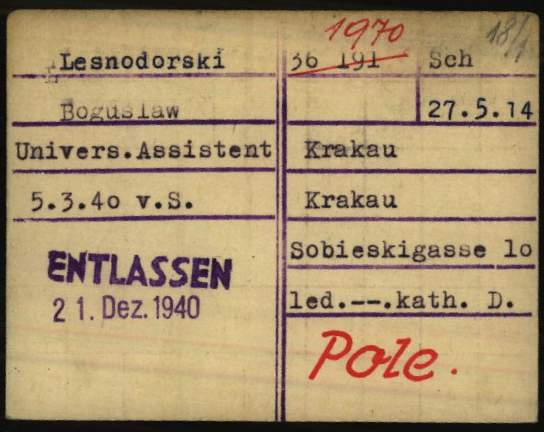
Registration card of Bogusław Leśnodorski as a prisoner at Dachau Nazi Concentration Camp
