= Miron Babiak =

Polish sea captain

Captain Miron Babiak M.M
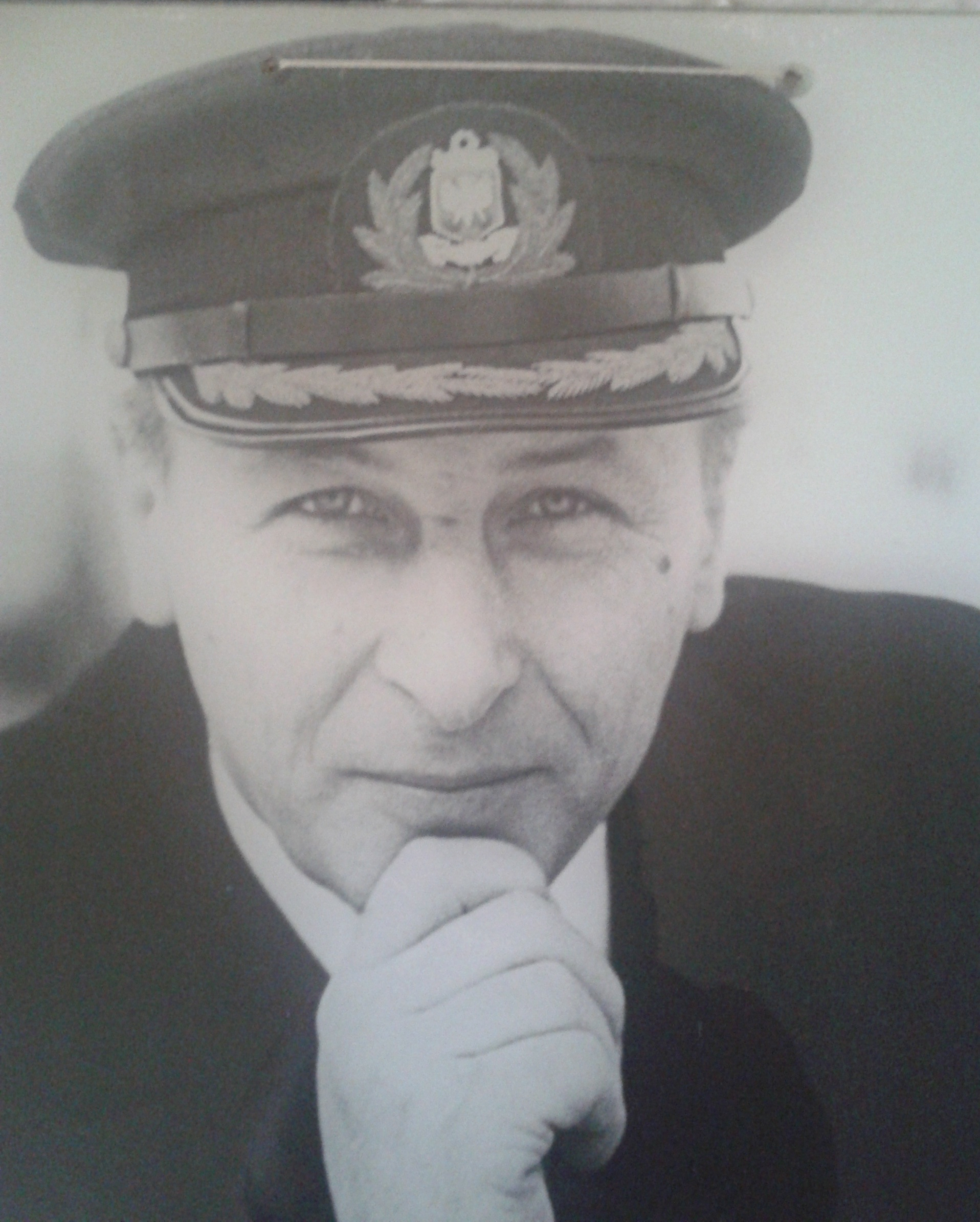
- Babiak in 1973
- Born: 31 January 1932; Sanok, Poland
- Died: 25 September 2013 (aged 81); Gdynia, Poland
- Occupation: Ship captain
- Known for: Captain of RV Profesor Siedlecki

Miron Babiak (January 31, 1932 in Sanok, Poland – September 25, 2013 in Gdynia, Poland) was a Polish sea captain who is best known for commanding the RV Profesor Siedlecki Antarctica research ship.

== Career ==
Babiak was an alumnus of Szkoła Rybołóstwa Morskiego in Gdynia. From 1951 onwards he was a first officer on ships belonging to Dalmor. In 1959 he became a captain, then four years later gained the Marine Master diploma. In 1975 the research vessel Profesor Siedlecki took its second cruise, commanded by Babiak to explore the fishing grounds of the Kerguelen Islands. The success of this journey led to three further expeditions of the Profesor Siedlecki. In 1977 he was awarded the "Gdańszczanin Roku" ("Man of the Gdańsk") prestige prize for his achievements.
