= Wacław Sobieski =

Polish historian, professor, and author

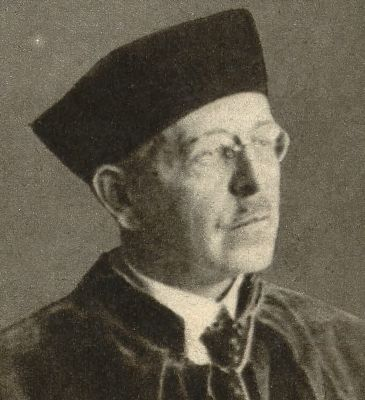
Waclaw Sobieski

Wacław Sobieski (October 26, 1872, in Lwów – April 3, 1935, in Kraków, Poland) was a Polish historian.

== Biography ==
Sobieski was a professor at the Jagiellonian University in Kraków, a member of the Polish Academy of Learning (Polska Akademia Umiejętności (PAU), and author of many works on the history of Poland especially of the 17th century.

Among his pupils were Henryk Barycz, Władysław Czapliński, Oskar Halecki, Kazimierz Piwarski, Ludwik Kolankowski, Adam Lewak, Kazimierz Chodynicki, Stanisław Bodniak, Kazimierz Lepszy, Kazimierz Piwarski, Wacław Pociecha.

== Publications ==
- Wacław Sobieski, Trybun ludu szlacheckiego (1905)
- Wacław Sobieski, Polska a hugenoci po nocy św. Bartłomieja (1910)
- Wacław Sobieski, Dzieje Polski (History of Poland, 1923–25)
- Wacław Sobieski, Archiwum Jana Zamoyskiego (1904)
