= Aleksander Kocwa =

Polish chemist (1901–1959)

- Born: 26 August 1901; Lemberg, Austro-Hungarian Empire
- Died: 11 January 1959 (aged 57); Kraków
- Citizenship: Polish
- Education: Jagiellonian University
- Occupation: chemist

Aleksander Kocwa (26 August 1901 – 11 January 1959) was a Polish chemist, professor of the Jagiellonian University, dean of the Faculty of Pharmacy of the Jagiellonian University and of the Faculty of Pharmacy of the Medical College in Kraków. Arrested during Sonderaktion Krakau, he was imprisoned in Sachsenhausen and Dachau concentration camps. After the release he organized secret teaching for students of pharmacy and chemistry in Nazi-occupied Kraków.

== Biography ==
He born in Lemberg, then in the Austro-Hungarian Empire as the son of Juliusz Kocwa and Zofia Dąbrowiecka, grandson of Aniela Vetulani from his father's side. He graduated from high school in Kraków, and in 1922, there from the Faculty of Chemistry and Technics of the State Industrial School. At the school, since 1922 until 1924, he was "an assistant under the direction of professor J. Buraczewski". In 1924 he graduated from the Faculty of Philosophy of the Jagiellonian University. Since 1924 until 1925 he was an assistant in the Department of Electrometallurgy at the Mining Academy in Kraków, and in 1925–1930 the assistant in the Department of Organic Chemistry of the Jagiellonian University, where he worked under the direction of Karol Dziewoński.

On 4 May 1929 he received Ph.D. in chemistry based on a dissertation about acids. In 1930 he was appointed assistant professor at the Faculty of Philosophy of the Jagiellonian University and was appointed head of the Department of Pharmaceutical Chemistry. In 1936 he received veniam legendi in the field of organic and pharmaceutical chemistry, and in 1938 the title of associate professor of pharmaceutical chemistry at the home faculty.

On 6 November 1939 he was arrested, among 184 other academics and professors, by the German soldiers in Sonderaktion Krakau. Initially he was imprisoned in the Montelupich Prison. Later he was transferred to the barracks at Mazowiecka Street in Kraków, and then to the prison in Wrocław. He was imprisoned in Sachsenhausen, where he stayed until March 1940, when he was transferred to Dachau. He was released in January 1941.

After returning to Kraków, in the years 1941–1945 he worked as a manager of the factory and analytical laboratory of the company "Pharma". He remained a scientific advisor of the company until 1950. During the occupation, Kocwa also ran secret teaching for students of pharmacy and chemistry, examining students and developing curriculum.

In 1945 he returned to the position of professor and head of the Department of Pharmaceutical Chemistry at the Jagiellonian University. In 1947 he was appointed professor, in 1948–1950 he served as dean of the Faculty of Pharmacy of the Jagiellonian University. In 1958 he was re-dean of the Faculty of Pharmacy, which administratively entered already part of newly established autonomous Medical College in Kraków. In this position he remained until his death in January 1959.

Kocwa published 35 scientific papers in the field of organic and pharmaceutical chemistry. He was married to Elżbieta Bargiel. They had two daughters: Renata and Jolanta.
