= Michał Marian Siedlecki =

Polish zoologist

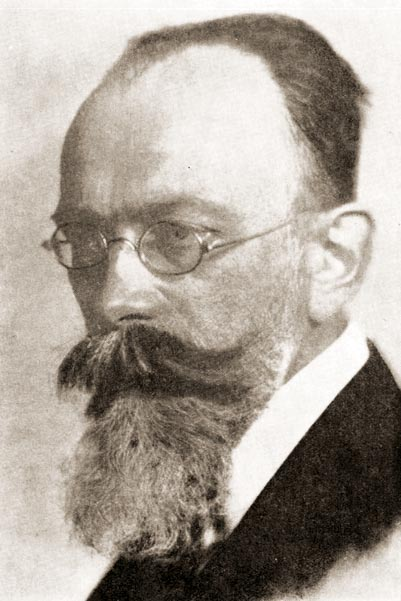
Michał Siedlecki

Michał Marian Siedlecki (8 September 1873, in Kraków – 11 January 1940, in Sachsenhausen concentration camp) was a Polish zoologist.

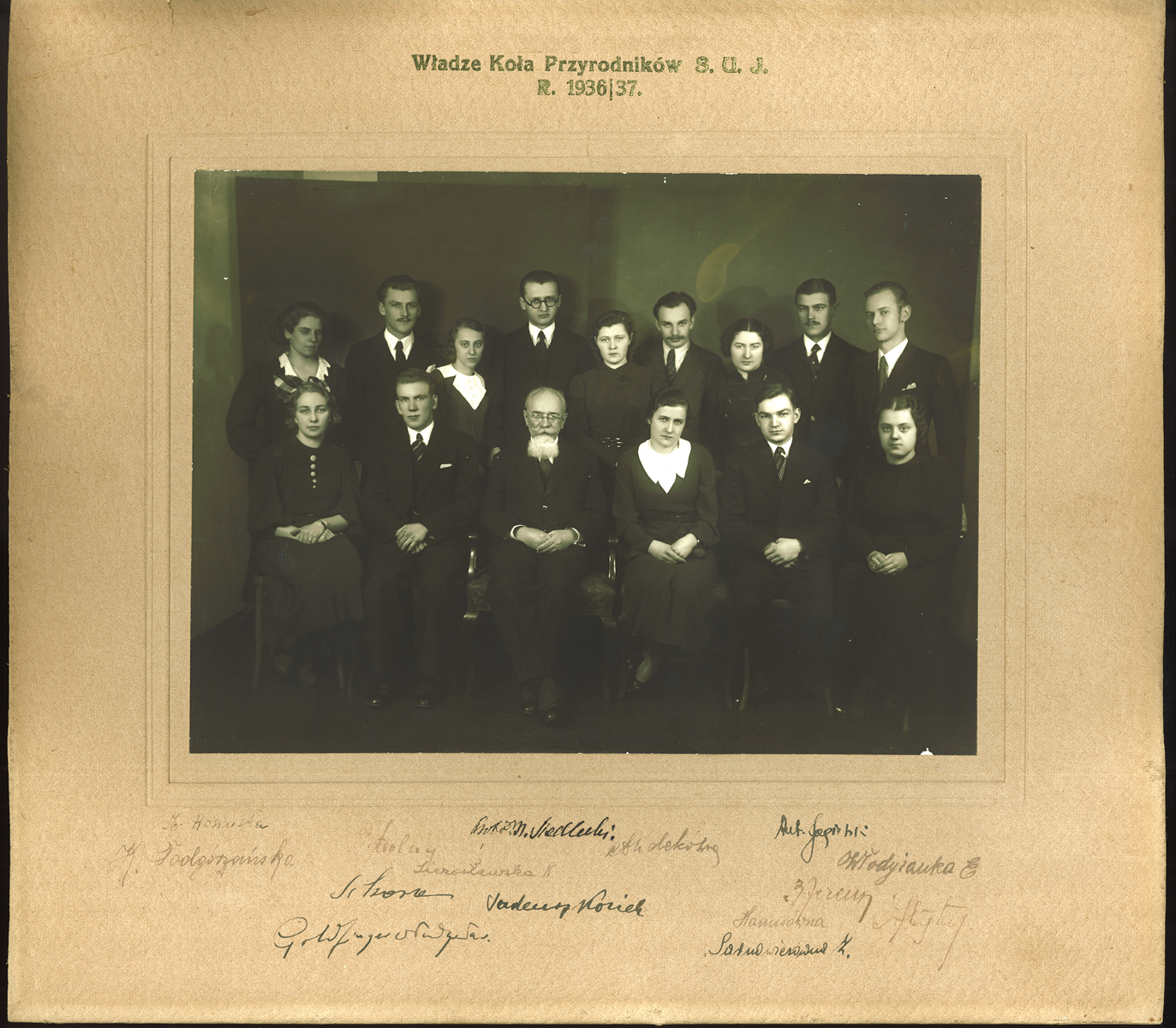
Michał Siedlecki as the curator of Jagiellonian University's student naturalist class (sitting in the midst)

== Biography ==
In 1891, he graduated from St. George High School (Gimnazjum św. Jacka) in Krakow. In the years 1891-1895, he studied zoology at the Jagiellonian University in Kraków, followed by supplementary studies at the Berlin Zoological Institute (1895-1896) and the Collège de France and the Institut Pasteur at the University of Paris.

In 1895, he received the title of Doctor of Philosophy, and in 1899, he was Associate Professor of Zoology. In 1904, he became an associate professor. In 1912, he became head of the Department of Zoology at the university. In the years 1919-1921, he was rector of the Stefan Batory University in Vilnius. In 1921, he returned to the Jagiellonian University. He studied general biology and marine biology.

In 1921, he was co-initiator of the creation of the Maritime Fishery Laboratory on Hel and the Warsaw Birds Research Station in Warsaw in 1931. He represented Poland at the International Council for the Exploration of the Sea in Copenhagen and the International Bureau for Nature Conservation in Brussels. He participated in scientific expeditions to Egypt, India, Africa, Ceylon and Java. In the years 1923-1938, he was a member of the State Council for Nature Conservation.

In research he dealt with protozoology, cytology and marine biology. He also conducted research in the field of marine biology and created a rational basis for marine fisheries. He fought for the protection of rare animals, including bison, whales, sturgeon, and many bird species. He led a comprehensive study of adaptation mechanisms of animals to tropical conditions. Together with Franciszek Krzyształowicz, he studied the pathogenesis of syphilis and Treponema pallidum, and he helped explain the pathogenesis of malaria with Fritz Schaudinn.

In 1903, he became a correspondent of the Academy of Skills and, in 1920, he was an active member of the Polish Academy of Arts. He was also a member of the Warsaw Scientific Society. He was Doctor honoris causa of universities in Vilnius and Strasbourg.

After the beginning of the German occupation in Poland, he was arrested on 6 November 1939 in the Sonderaktion Krakau.

He was the author of many scientific and popular science papers and a number of special hearings, especially in the field of sporulation research.

== Death and legacy ==
Siedlecki died on 11 January 1940 in the Sachsenhausen camp. An urn with the professor's ashes arrived in Kraków, where it was placed in the Rakowicki Cemetery.

On 14 February 1942, a requiem mass was held for Siedlecki and 16 other professors from the University of Kraków who died in German concentration camps or as a result of their treatment at St. Aloysius Catholic Church in Oxford, England.

A Polish Oceanographic Research Ship was named for him ("RV Profesor Siedlecki").
