= Wiktor Ormicki =

Polish geographer and cartographer (1898–1941)

Wiktor Rudolf Ormicki
- Wiktor Rudolf Nusbaum
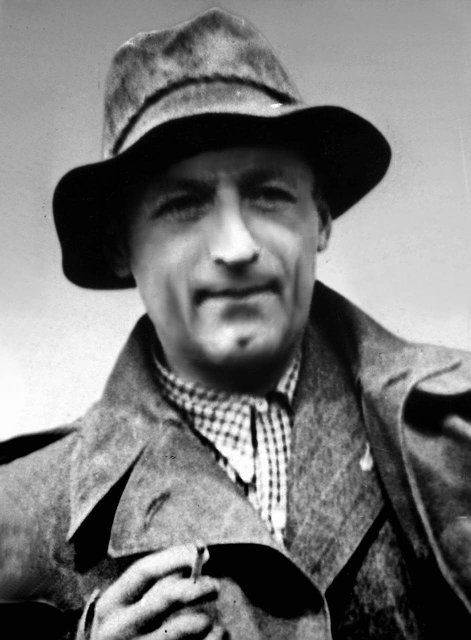
- Born: 1 February 1898; Kraków, Galicia, Austria-Hungary
- Died: 17 September 1941 (aged 43); Mauthausen, Nazi Germany

Wiktor Ormicki (born Wiktor Rudolf Nusbaum; 1 February 1898 – 17 September 1941) was a Polish geographer and cartographer, and a university professor.

A specialist in economical geography and demography, he served at various posts in the Jagiellonian University, Free Polish University, Higher Trade School of Kraków and Lwów University. He was the author of a major study, Rozwój polskiej myśli geograficzno-gospodarczej 1866–1929 (1932).

In 1924, he changed his last name to Ormicki. He was of Jewish descent. Arrested by the Germans during World War II in Sonderaktion Krakau, he was murdered in the Mauthausen-Gusen concentration camp.

== Works ==
- O polski program ludnościowy. Odbitka z tygodnika "Naród i Państwo", 1939
- Skup zawodowy i handel obnośny w woj: Wileńskim, Nowogródzkim, Poleskim i Wołyńskim, 1938
- Problemat ludnościowy w Polsce, 1937
- Granice współczesnej pojemności ludnościowej w województwie krakowskim, 1937
- Warunki i możliwości emigracji żydowskiej, 1937
- Rzemiosło w okręgu Izby Rzemieślniczej w Krakowie, 1936
- Struktura demograficzna wychodźtwa sezonowego z Ziemi wileṅskiej do Łotwy w roku 1935
- Kapitał pieniężny jako przedmiot badań geografii gospodarczej, 1935
- Le Silésie Polonaise, 1934 (fr)
- Rozwój polskiej myśli geograficzno-gospodarczej 1866–1929, 1932
- Gęstość wiejskiej ludności rolniczej w Polsce, 1931
- Życie gospodarcze Kresów Wschodnich Rzeczypospolitej Polskiej. Z 6 ilustracjami oraz z atlasem, 1929
- Eksport drewna w górnem polskiem dorzeczu Dunajca i Popradu 1927.

== See also ==
- List of Holocaust victims
