= Franciszek Krzyształowicz =

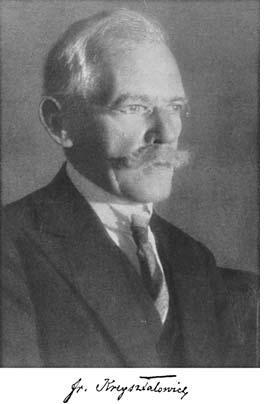

24th Rector of the University of Warsaw
- In office 1924–1925
- Preceded by: Ignacy Koschembahr-Łyskowski
- Succeeded by: Stefan Pieńkowski

Personal details
- Born: 1868
- Died: 1931 (aged 62–63)
- Profession: Dermatologist

Franciszek Krzyształowicz (1868 – 1931) was a Polish dermatologist. He served as the rector of the University of Warsaw from 1924 to 1925. In 1919 he became the professor and head of dermatology at the University of Warsaw. He was one of the founders of the Polish Dermatological Society.
