= Stok, Radzyń County =

Stok
- Village
- Location within Poland
- Coordinates: 51°50′N 22°28′E
- Country: Poland
- Voivodeship: Lublin
- County: Radzyń
- Gmina: Ulan-Majorat

Stok [stɔk] is a village in the administrative district of Gmina Ulan-Majorat, within Radzyń County, Lublin Voivodeship, in eastern Poland.
