= Stanisław Tochowicz =

Polish metallurgist and academic (1923–1994)

- Born: 7 May 1923
- Died: 3 October 1994 (aged 71)
- Citizenship: Polish
- Education: AGH University of Science and Technology
- Occupation: metallurgist

Stanisław Tochowicz (7 May 1923 – 3 October 1994) was a Polish metallurgist, professor of technical sciences, professor and Director of the Institute of Metallurgy of the Silsesian Polytechnic, prorector of the Silsesian Polytechnic, professor and Head of the Department of Metallurgy of Steel at the Częstochowa Polytechnic.

== Biography ==
He was born in 1925 as the son of Antoni Tochowicz from Słomniki near Kraków, and Kazimiera Florentyna Tochowicz née Malska. He had four siblings. Cardiologist Leon Tochowicz was his relative.

In 1949 he graduated from the AGH University of Science and Technology in Kraków. From 1948, he worked at the "Pokój" steelworks in Nowy Bytom, where he came to the position of the steel mill's main technologist. In 1952, at the age of twenty-nine, he became the main steelworker of the Central Board of the Steel Industry (Centralny Zarząd Przemysłu Hutniczego). Then he became the deputy director for technical progress in the Union of Iron and Steel Industry (Zjednoczenie Hutnictwa Żelaza i Stali).

In 1968 he started working at the Silsesian Polytechnic. He organized a branch of the Polytechnic in Katowice. He was a professor and Director of the Institute of Metallurgy, and also a vice-rector of the Silsesian Polytechnic. In 1982 he moved to the Częstochowa Polytechnic, where he focused on scientific research and headed the Steel Metallurgy Department. He was particularly involved in the research on the use of plasma in metallurgy.

He was an expert of the United Nations Industrial Development Organization in South America, Africa and Turkey. He was an active member of the Association of Engineers and Technicians of the Steel Industry (Stowarzyszenie Inżynierów i Techników Przemysłu Hutniczego), that granted him an honorary membership, and was the editor of several scientific journals. In 1990 he obtained the academic title of professor.

He was married and had two children.

He retired in 1993. He died on 3 October 1994. He was buried at the Rakowicki Cemetery in Kraków (quarter XXXIV, row: south, place: 19).

== Works (selection) ==
- Wytrawianie stalowych blach cienkich w kwasach. Stalinogród: Wydawnictwo Górniczo-Hutnicze. 1955. Co-author: Leonid Andrejew.
- Dokumentacja planowania wykonawczego produkcji wydziału stalowni. Warszawa: Państwowe Wydawnictwa Techniczne. 1953. Co-authors: Bogdan Kołomyjski, Jerzy Czarny.
- Elektrometalurgia stali. Katowice: Wydawnictwo "Śląsk". 1973. Co-author: Tadeusz Mazanek.
- Wpływ intensywności przenoszenia masy na kinetykę wielofazowych procesów metalurgicznych. Katowice: Politechnika Śląska. Instytut Metalurgii. 1977.
- Metalurgia próżniowa stali. Katowice: Wydawnictwo "Śląsk". 1978. Co-author: Zygmunt Klisiewicz.

== Awards ==
- Gold Cross of Merit (1955)
