= Ignacy Koschembahr-Łyskowski =

Polish jurist

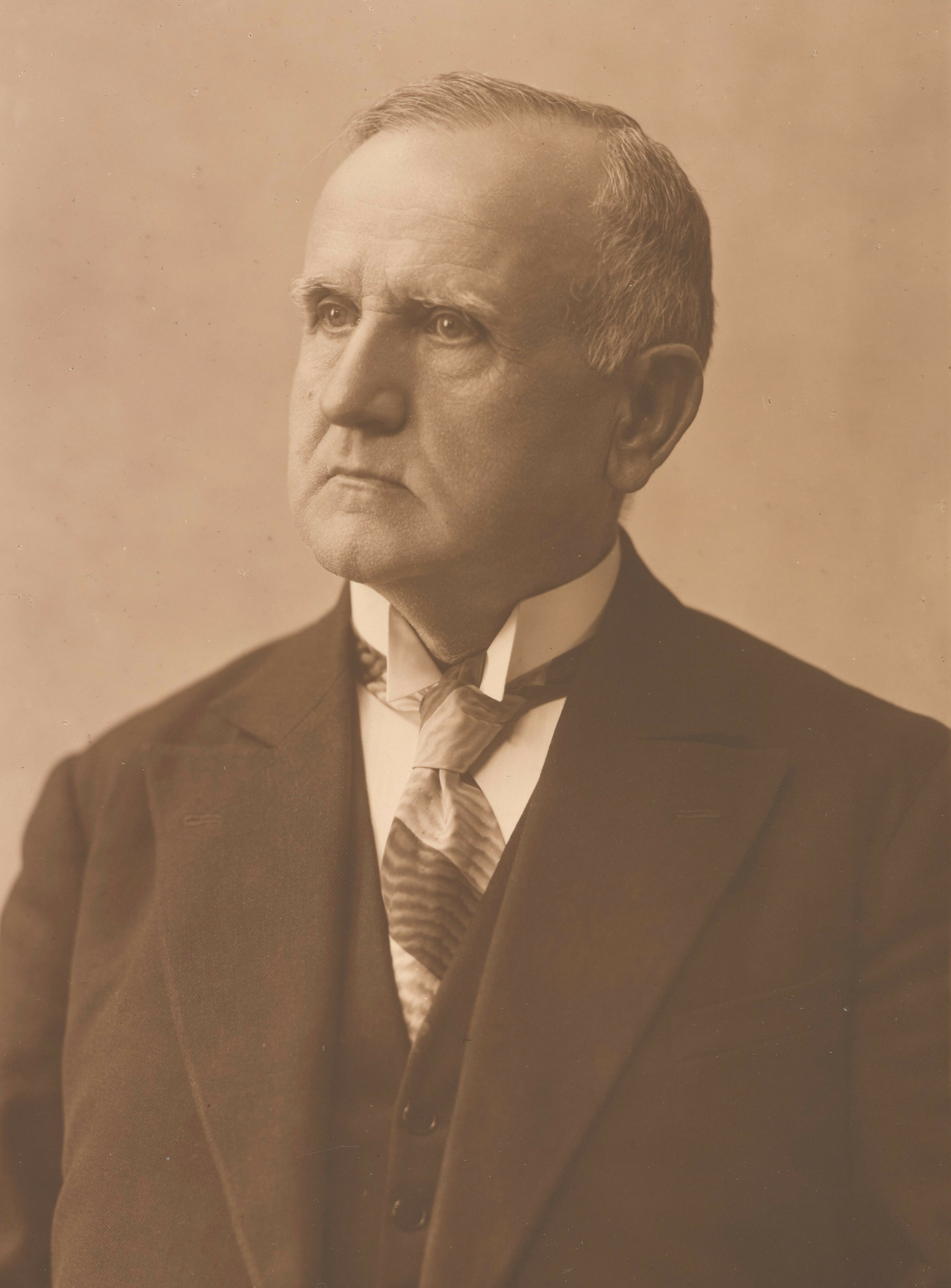
Ignacy Koschembahr-Łyskowski (1938)

Ignacy Koschembahr-Łyskowski (1864–1945) was a Polish jurist and scholar of civil law.

After studies in Berlin and a habilitation in Breslau, Koschembahr-Łyskowski taught Roman law at the universities of Fribourg, Lemberg and Warsaw from 1895 to 1930.

Koschembahr-Łyskowski was a member and, since 1927, the vice president of the legislative committee that sought to reunify the law of the re-established Polish republic. He created a draft of the general provisions of a Polish civil code.
