= Sonderaktion Krakau =

World War II German operation in Poland

- Part of Generalplan Ost and Intelligenzaktion
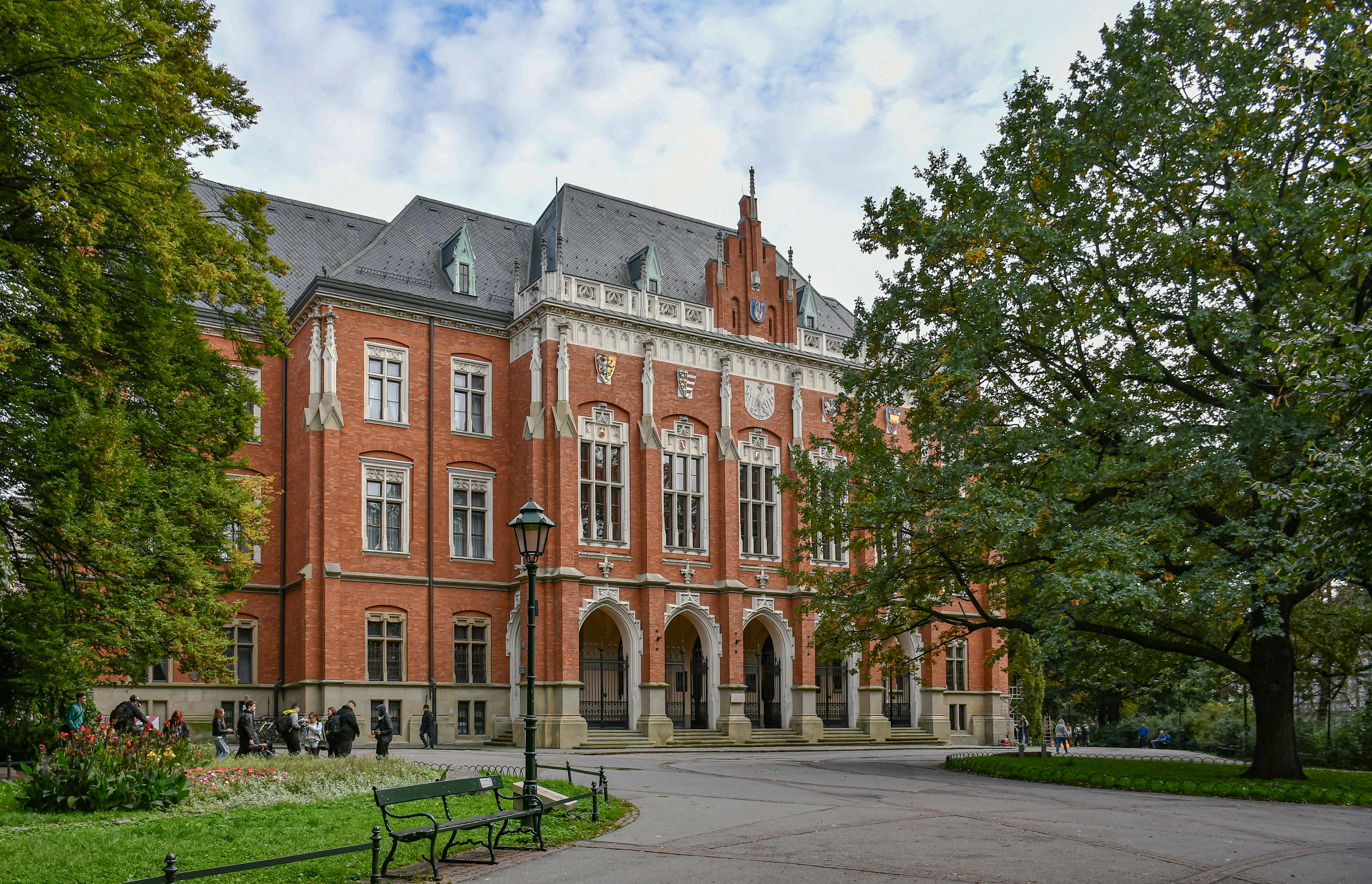
- Collegium Novum of the Jagiellonian University in Kraków. Location of the Sonderaktion Krakau
- Location: Kraków, German-occupied Poland
- Date: 6 November 1939
- Target: 184 academics including 105 professors and 33 lecturers from UJ, 34 professors and doctors from AGH, four from AE, four from Lublin and Wilno universities, and others
- Attack type: Deportations to Sachsenhausen and Dachau concentration camps
- Perpetrators: (Nazi Germany) German government, SS-Obersturmbannführer Bruno Müller
- Motive: Anti-slavism, Anti-polonism, Nazi racist doctrines

Sonderaktion Krakau was a German operation against professors and academics of the Jagiellonian University and other universities in German-occupied Kraków, Poland, at the beginning of World War II. It was carried out as part of the much broader action plan, the Intelligenzaktion, to eradicate the Polish intellectual elite, especially in those centers (such as Kraków) that were intended by the Germans to become culturally German.

It is not clear if Sonderaktion Krakau (special operation Kraków) was the actual German codename. The reason for the detention was communicated to professors in the concentration camp.

== Course of operation ==
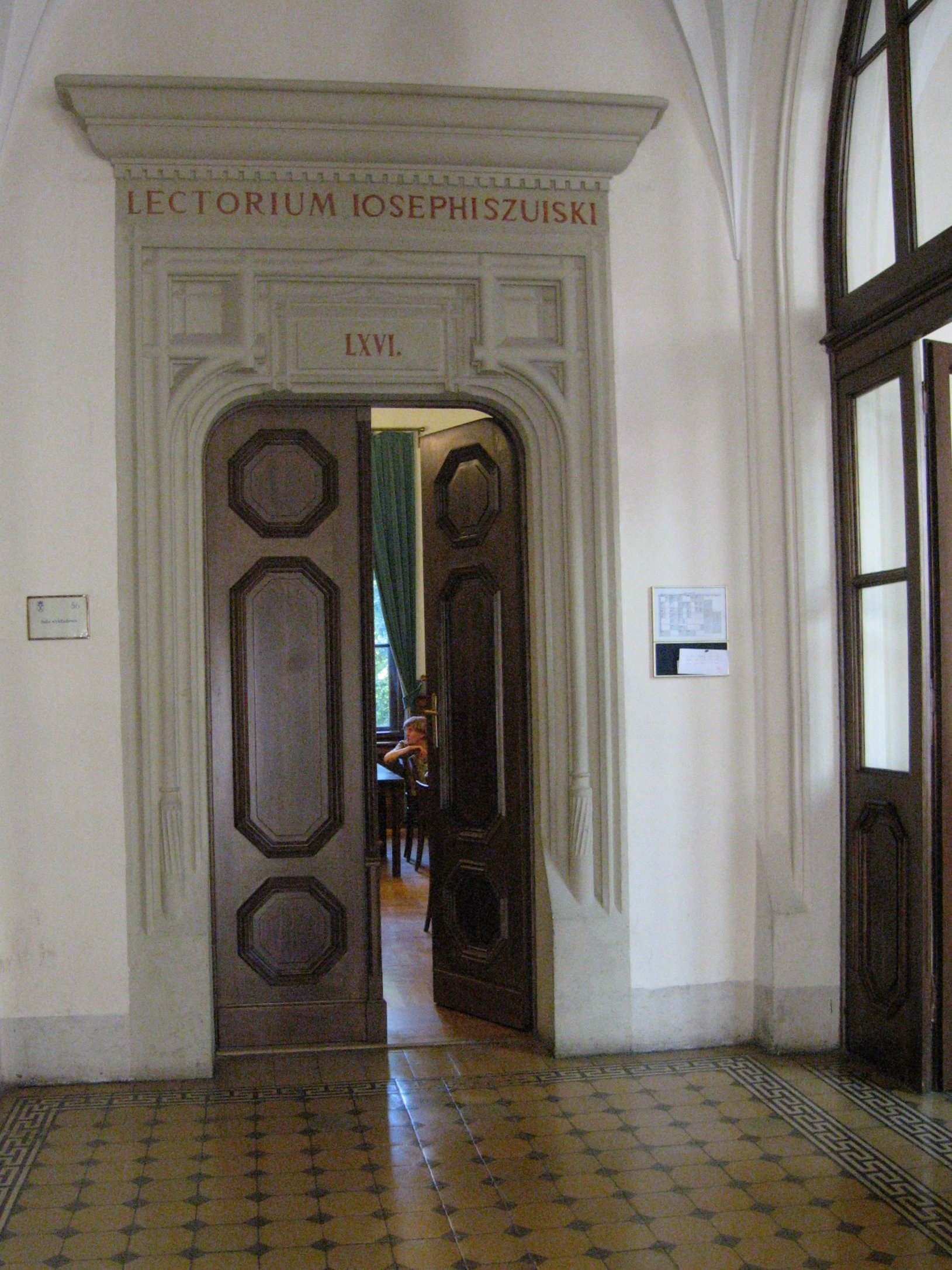
Jagiellonian University lecture room No. 56 trap

Soon after the establishment of the German occupation of Poland, following the invasion of Poland, on 19 October 1939, the Senate of the Jagiellonian University decided to open the university for a new academic year, which was to start on 13 November. This decision was communicated to German occupation authorities, who did not express objections. However, on 3 November, the Gestapo chief in Kraków SS-Obersturmbannführer Bruno Müller, commanded Jagiellonian University rector Professor Tadeusz Lehr-Spławiński to require all professors to attend his lecture about German plans for Polish education. The rector agreed and sent an invitation throughout the university for a meeting scheduled at the administrative center building in the Collegium Novum (entrance pictured). On 6 November 1939, in lecture room no. 66 (currently no. 56) at noon, all academics and their guests gathered; among them, 105 professors and 33 lecturers from Jagiellonian University (UJ), four from University of Economics (AE) and four from Lublin and Wilno. There were also 34 professors and doctors from University of Technology (AG), who did not intend to start the academic year, and attended their own meeting in a different room.

The academics filled the hall but no Vortrag (lecture) on education was given. Instead, they were told by Müller that the university did not have permission to start a new academic year and that Poles were hostile toward German science and acted in bad faith. They were arrested on the spot by armed policemen, frisked, and escorted out. Some senior professors were kicked, slapped in the face (Stanisław Estreicher) and hit with rifle butts. An additional 13–15 university employees and students who were on site were also arrested, as well as the President of Kraków, Dr Stanisław Klimecki who was apprehended at home that afternoon.

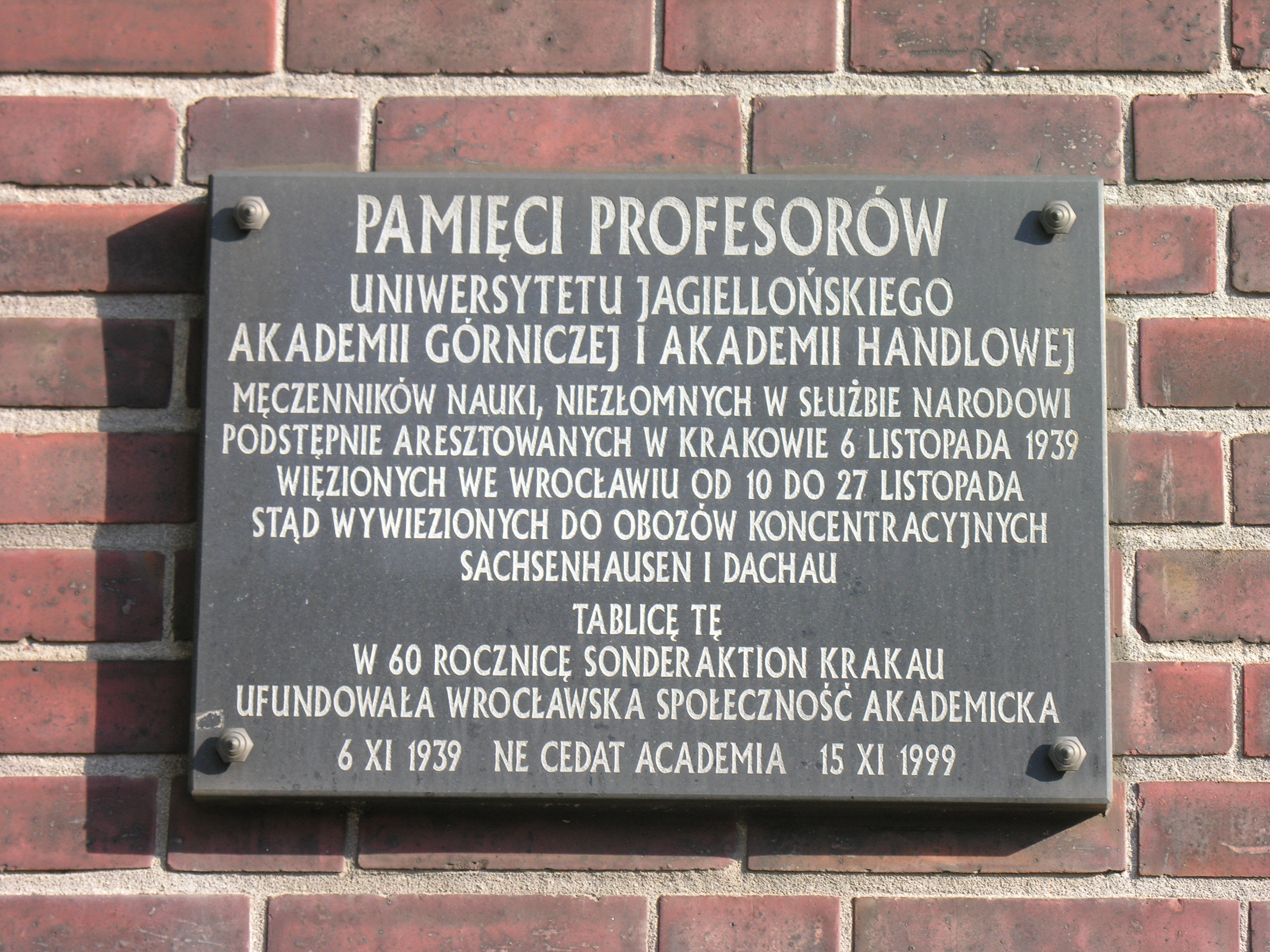
Memorial plaque at the former detention center in Wrocław

All 184 persons were transported first to prison at Montelupich Street, then to barracks at Mazowiecka, and—three days later—to a detention center in Breslau, Germany (now Wrocław, Poland), where they spent 18 days split between two prison facilities: the detention center (Untersuchungsgefängnis, at the Świebodzka 1 Street), and the Strafgefängnis penal complex at Kleczkowska 35. The Gestapo were unprepared for such a large transfer of prisoners, and awaited permission to send them to Buchenwald concentration camp. However, that was filled to capacity and so, on 27 November 1939, at night, they were loaded onto a train to Sachsenhausen concentration camp located on the other side of Berlin, and in March 1940, sent further to Dachau concentration camp near Munich after a new batch of arrested younger academics arrived.

=== Release ===
Following loud international protest by prominent Italians including Benito Mussolini and the Vatican, 101 professors who were older than 40 were released from Sachsenhausen on 8 February 1940. Additional academics were released later. Some elderly professors did not survive the roll-calls, held three times a day even in ice and snow, and the grim living conditions where dysentery was common, warm clothes rare and food rations scarce. Twelve died in the camp within three months, and another five within weeks of release. Three professors of Jewish origin were separated and later were murdered or died of other causes: (Leon Sternbach, Wiktor Ormicki and Joachim Metallmann). Among the notable professors who died in the camp were Ignacy Chrzanowski (UJ; 19 January 1940), Stanisław Estreicher (UJ; 29 December 1939), Kazimierz Kostanecki (UJ; 11 January 1940), Antoni Meyer (AGH; 24 December 1939) and Michał Siedlecki (UJ; 11 January 1940, after roll-call). In March 1940, the able prisoners from Kraków who remained alive were sent to Dachau concentration camp and most released in January 1941 on intervention. The last one, Kazimierz Piwarski, was released in late 1941.

Many of those who went through Sonderaktion Krakau and the internment formed an underground university in 1942 in defiance of the German punitive edicts. Among the 800 students of their underground college was Karol Wojtyła, the future Pope John Paul II, taught by Prof. Tadeusz Lehr-Spławiński among others.

Today there is a plaque commemorating the events of Sonderaktion Krakau in front of Collegium Novum in Kraków. Every 6 November, black flags are hung outside all Jagiellonian University buildings, and the Rector of the university lays wreaths to honor those who suffered.

== Prominent personalities arrested during Sonderaktion Krakau ==
Below is a partial list of selected prominent academics and university graduates arrested on 6 November 1939.

- Tadeusz Banachiewicz
- Aleksander Birkenmajer
- Ignacy Chrzanowski
- Stanisław Estreicher
- Tadeusz Estreicher
- Stanisław Gołąb
- Zdzisław Jachimecki
- Stanisław Klimecki
- Aleksander Kocwa
- Władysław Konopczyński
- Kazimierz Kostanecki
- Tadeusz Jan Kowalski
- Stanisław Kutrzeba
- Tadeusz Lehr-Spławiński
- Franciszek Leja
- Kazimierz Lepszy
- Bogusław Leśnodorski
- Mieczysław Małecki
- Wiktor Ormicki
- Stanisław Pigoń
- Kazimierz Piwarski
- Jan Stanisławski (lexicographer)
- Leon Sternbach
- Leon Tochowicz
- Tadeusz Ważewski
- Władysław Wolter

== In popular culture ==
- Sonderaktion Krakau is depicted in the 2005 miniseries Karol: A Man Who Became Pope and the 2007 Polish film Katyń directed by Andrzej Wajda, which was nominated for Best Foreign Language Film at the 80th Academy Awards ceremony.

== See also ==
- Intelligenzaktion
- Aktion Krakau
- German AB-Aktion operation in Poland
- Invasion of Poland
- Massacre of Lviv professors
- Operation Tannenberg
- Treatment of Polish citizens by occupiers
- Generalplan Ost

== Sources ==
- Banach, A.K., Dybiec, J. & Stopka, K. The History of the Jagiellonian University. Kraków: Jagiellonian University Press, 2000.
- Burek, Edward (ed.) “Sonderaktion Krakau” in Encyklopedia Krakowa. Kraków: PWM, 2000.
- Gawęda, Stanisław. Uniwersytet Jagielloński w okresie II wojny światowej 1939–1945. Kraków: WLK, 1986.
- Gwiazdomorski, Jan (in Polish). Wspomnienia z Sachsenhausen [Memoiries from Sachsenhausen]. Kraków: Wydawnictow Literackie, 1975.
