= Leon Tochowicz =

Polish internist and cardiologist (1897–1965)

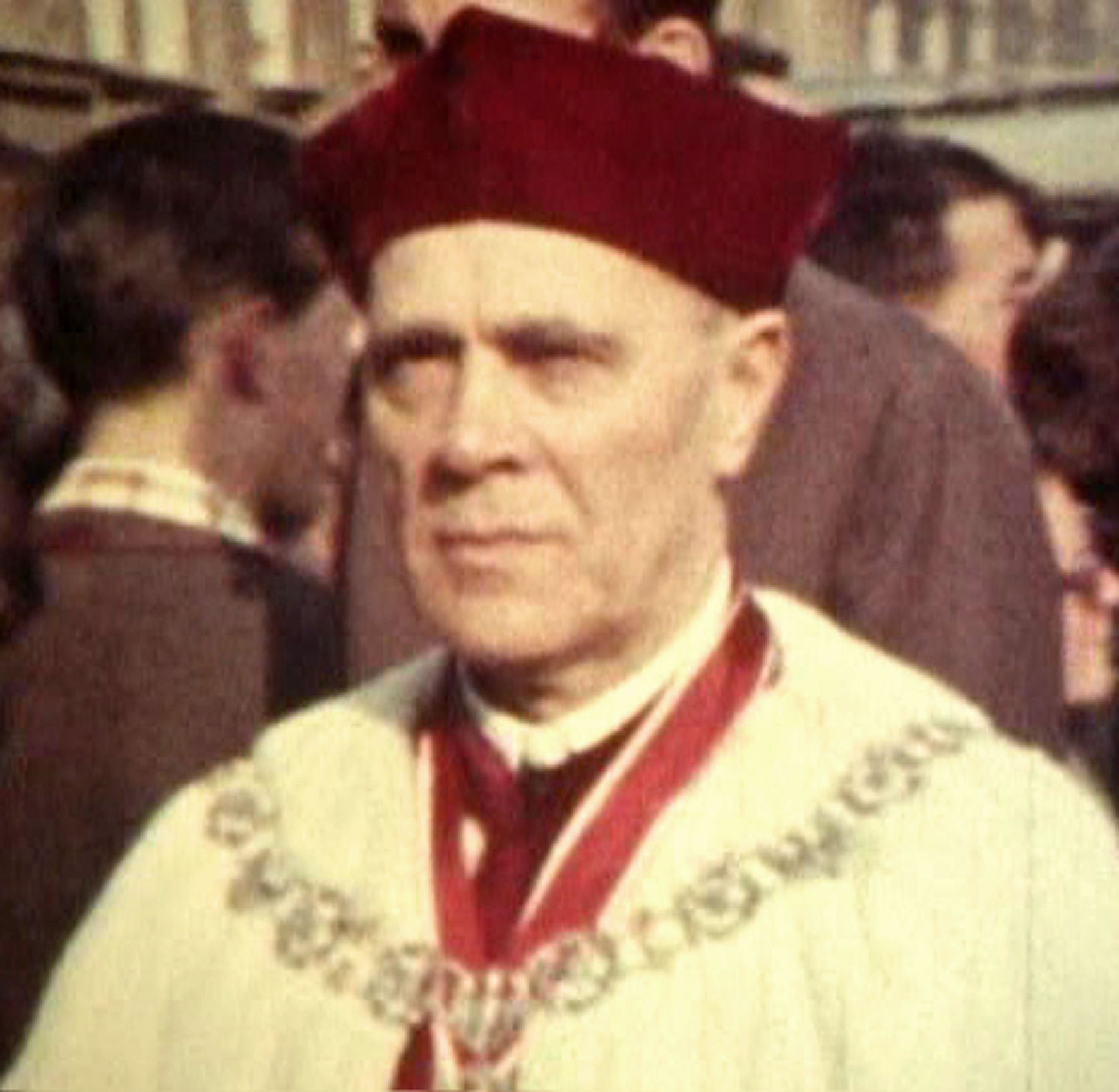
- Leon Tochowicz - during the march on the occasion of the 600th anniversary of Jagiellonian University (Krakow, 10 May 1964)
- Born: 18 July 1897; Igołomia
- Died: 29 July 1965 (aged 68); Kraków
- Citizenship: Polish
- Occupations: physician cardiologist
- Parent(s): Leon Tochowicz; Dorota née Nawrocka

Leon Tochowicz (18 July 1897 – 29 July 1965) was a Polish internist and cardiologist.

For three terms he was a rector of the Medical Academy in Kraków (1957–65), and was referred to as the "founder of the Kraków school of cardiology". He was the author of nearly one hundred original research papers, mostly in the field of clinical cardiology, and was the initiator of the construction of the Institute of Pediatrics in Kraków-Prokocim, nowadays the University Children's Hospital in Kraków.

Fighting in the ranks of the Polish Army, he took part in the Polish–Soviet War (1918–1920) and in the 1939 Defensive War. In November 1939 he was imprisoned during the Sonderaktion Krakau action, and was sent to Sachsenhausen concentration camp.

== Biography ==
He was born in the village of Igołomia as the son of Leon Tochowicz, a merchant, and Dorota née Nawrocka. In 1918 he volunteered for the Polish Army to take part in the war against the Bolsheviks. In 1920 he started studies in medicine at the Jagiellonian University. He obtained Ph.D. in medical sciences in 1926, after which he started working at the University as an assistant at the First Department of Internal Medicine. He received the habilitation in internal medicine on 12 July 1938.

He took part in the 1939 Defensive War as a medical officer. On 6 November 1939, as part of the Sonderaktion Krakau action, together with a group of other professors and lecturers of the Jagiellonian University, he was arrested by the Germans and deported to the Sachsenhausen concentration camp. After his release in 1940, he returned to Kraków and ran a private medical practice.

After the war, Tochowicz continued his academic work. He extended it to organizational activity, taking over in 1947, as the newly appointed professor, the leadership of the First Department of Internal Medicine at the Jagiellonian University. In 1956 he obtained the title of full professor. In the years 1954–57 he held the position of vice-rector, and in 1957–65 he was the rector of the Medical Academy in Kraków. In the 1960s he was the initiator of the construction of the Institute of Pediatrics in Kraków-Prokocim, nowadays the University Children's Hospital in Kraków. He was the vice-president of the Main Board of the Polish Cardiac Society (1954–1961) and the President of the Kraków Branch of the Polish Cardiac Society.

He worked mostly in the field of clinical cardiology, focusing, among others, on atherosclerosis and hypertension. He was the author of nearly one hundred original research papers in scientific journals. He is considered to be a pioneer of preventive cardiology in Poland.

He was a teacher of a number of cardiologists. Twenty-two doctors defended their doctoral thesis under his supervision, as well as ninety-six students of medical specialization. Among Tochowicz's students there were Władysław Król, Tadeusz Horzela and Leon Cholewa. Tochowicz's achievements in didactic activities made that he was by some referred to as the "founder of the Kraków school of cardiology".

He was awarded the Knight's Cross of the Order of Polonia Restituta and the Order of the Banner of Work (first class).

Tochowicz died in 1965 in Kraków. He was buried in the Avenue of the Meritorious of the Rakowicki Cemetery.

Stanisław Tochowicz, a metallurgist, was his relative.

== Works (selection) ==
- "Zachowanie się tryptofanu i histydyny w przebiegu choroby Biermera". Polskie Archiwum Medycyny Wewnętrznej (2). Kraków: 1151–1159. 1936.
- "Wartość kliniczna przednio-tylnego odprowadzenia w elektrokardiografii". Polska Gazeta Lekarska. 42 (15). Lwów. 1936.
- "Recherches sur la fluctuation du taux sanguin du tryptophane et de l'histidine au cours de la maladie de Biermar". Folia Haematologica. Leipzig: Ak. Verlagsgesellschaft: 240–248. 1936.
- "Recherches sur la fluctuation du taux des acides aminés chez les sujets atteints d'anémie pernicieuse de Biermer et chez les sujets atteints d'anémie posthémorragique". Folia Haematologica. Leipzig: Ak. Verlagsgesellschaft: 249–268. 1936.
- "Über den klinischen Wert der dorso-ventralen Ableitung in der Elektrokariographie". Zeitschrift für Kreislaufforschung. Dresden: T. Steinkopff: 712–727. 1937.
- Badania kliniczne nad wpływem wody ze śródła "Karola" w Iwoniczu, na wydzielanie soku żołądkowego, treści dwunastnicowej oraz na przemianę spoczynkową. 1937.
- "Wskazania i przeciwskazania dla leczenia klimato-balneo-hydrologicznego schorzeń układu krążenia". Acta Balneologica Polonica. 4 (2). Kraków. 1938.
- Badania kliniczne, doświadczalne i anatomo-patologiczne nad zachowaniem się układu krążenia w nadtarczyności. Kraków: Polska Akademia Umiejętności. 1938.
- Gruźlica jako zagadnienie społeczne wśród młodzieży akademickiej. Warszawa: Lekarski Instytut Naukowo-Wydawniczy. 1946.
- Zarys historii Krakowskiej Szkoły Medycznej: w 600-lecie Uniwersytetu Jagiellońskiego w Krakowie. Kraków: Państwowe Wydawnictwo Naukowe. 1962. English translation made by the author published that same year. German and French translations published in 1963.
- Sześćsetlecie medycyny krakowskiej: w sześćsetlecie Uniwersytetu Jagiellońskiego. Vol. 2. Kraków: Państwowe Wydawnictwo Naukowe. 1964. English translation published that same year.

== Commemoration ==
One of the streets in Kraków, in the district Swoszowice, was named after Leon Tochowicz.
