= Leon Sternbach =

Polish university teacher (1864–1940)

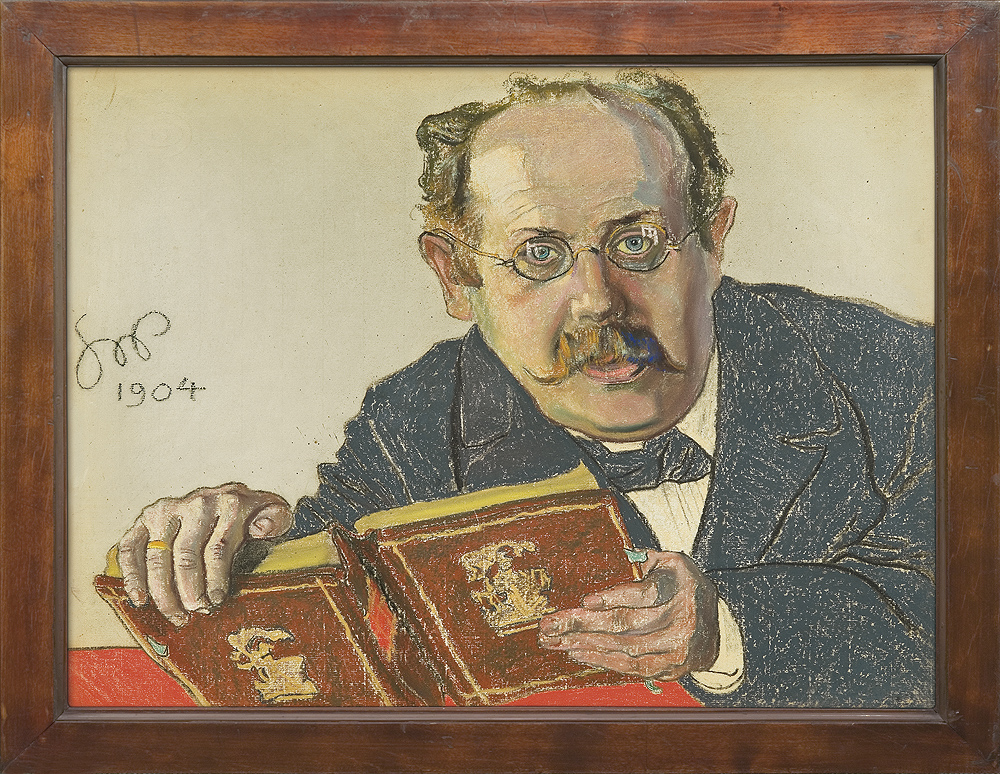
Portrait of Sternbach by Stanisław Wyspiański

Leon Sternbach (2 July 1864, in Drohobych – 20 February 1940, in Sachsenhausen concentration camp) was a Polish philologist and classicist, professor at Jagiellonian University, and member of Polish Academy of Arts and Sciences.

Leon Sternbach was of Jewish descent and had studied in Leipzig, Dresden and Vienna from 1882 to 1886. He initiated the study of ancient Byzantium within Poland. In 1939, two months after the German invasion of Poland, under Nazi occupation, Sternbach was arrested along with 184 other professors and staff of the Jagiellonian by the Gestapo during Sonderaktion Krakau. After being held in a Kraków Gestapo prison, he was sent to Sachsenhausen concentration camp, where he was murdered.
