= Ignacy Chrzanowski =

Polish historian (1866–1940)

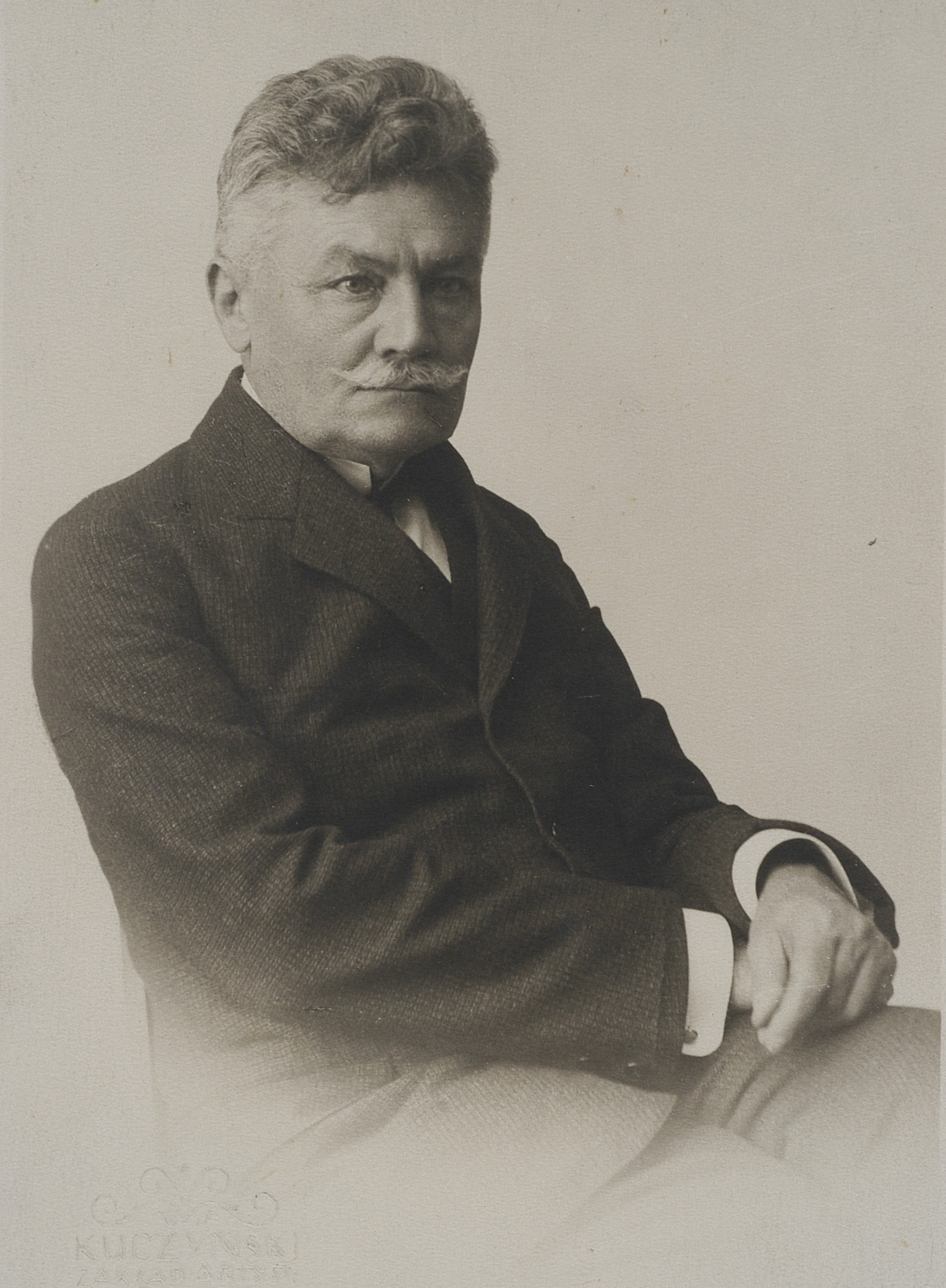
- Born: 5 February 1866; Stok
- Died: 19 January 1940 (aged 73); Sachsenhausen
- Occupation: Historian

Ignacy Chrzanowski (5 February 1866 in Stok – 19 January 1940) was a Polish historian of literature, professor of the Jagiellonian University, arrested by Germans as part of the Sonderaktion Krakau and killed in the Sachsenhausen concentration camp.

His daughter was Hanna Helena Chrzanowska.

== Works ==
- Tragedya Szymona Szymonowica „Castus Joseph” w stosunku do literatury obcej. 1892.
- Facecye Mikołaja Reja. 1894.
- Ideały romantycznej poezji polskiej. 1899.
- Pierwszy utwór Sienkiewicza. 1901.
- O satyrach Adama Naruszewicza. 1902.
- „Kazania sejmowe” Skargi. 1903.
- Krasicki jako autor „Monitora” z roku 1772. 1904.
- Marcin Bielski, studium literackie. 1906. 2 parts.
- Władysław Nehring. Wspomnienie pośmiertne. 1909.
- Z dziejów satyry polskiej XVIII wieku. 1909.
- Wypisy polskie dla klas wyższych szkół średnich. 1913. Co-authored with Konstanty Wojciechowski.
- Czym był Wirgiliusz dla Polaków po utracie niepodległości. 1915.
- „Ród ludzki” Staszyca jako wytwór filozofii oświecenia. 1915.
- O komediach Aleksandra Fredry. 1917.
- Poezja polska XVIII wieku. 1918.
- Z epoki romantyzmu. Studya i szkice. 1918.
- Źródło pomysłu rozprawy Jana Śniadeckiego „O pismach klasycznych i romantycznych”. 1930.
- Jan Długosz, próba charakterystyki człowieka. 1938.
- Studia i szkice. Rozbiory i krytyki. 1939. Two volumes.
- Joachim Lelewel. Człowiek i pisarz. 1946.

=== Editions ===
- Humanizm i reformacja w Polsce. 1927. Co-edited with Stanisław Kot.

== Commemoration ==
A memorial plaque to Ignacy Chrzanowski was installed at the 2 Plac Biskupi in Kraków.
