= Magdalena Maria Epstein =

Polish Dominican nurse and nun

Servant of God Magdalena Maria Epstein OP
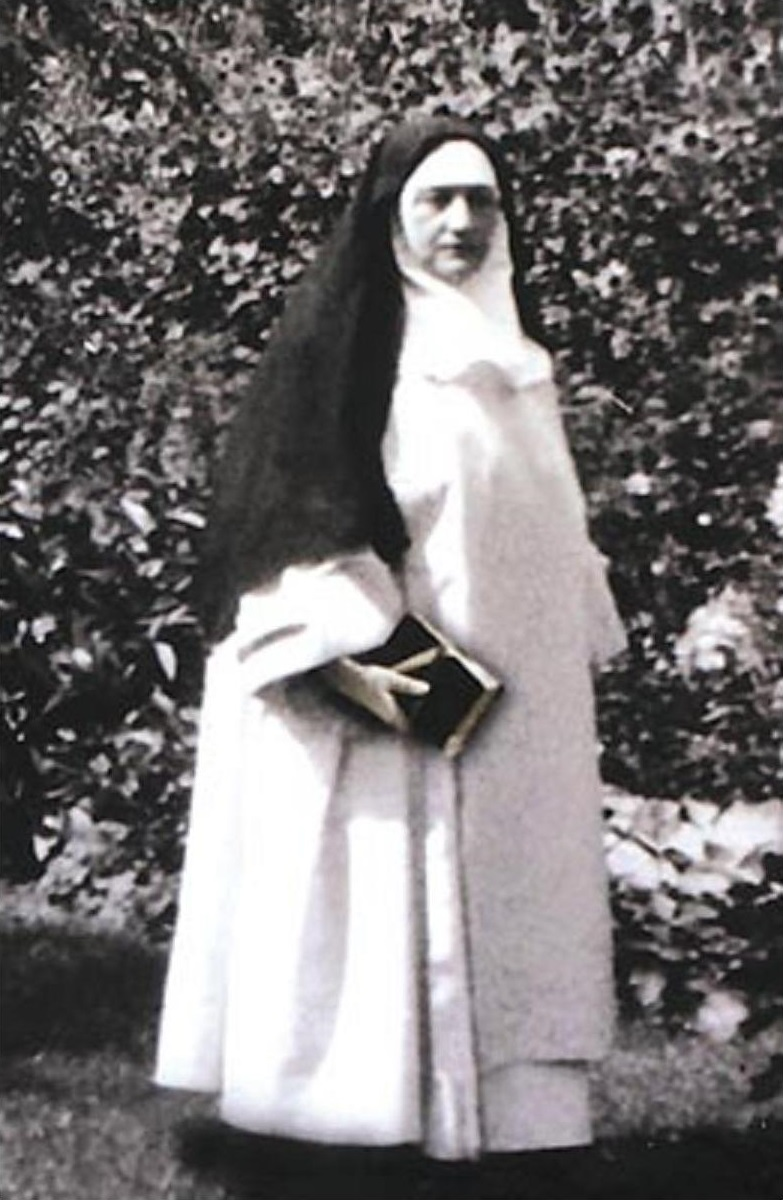
- Born: 2 August 1875; Pilica, Zawiercie, Poland
- Died: 6 September 1947 (aged 72); Kraków, Poland

Magdalena Maria Epstein, OP (2 August 1875 – 6 September 1947) was a Polish Catholic nurse who pioneered nursing education in Poland. She later became a Dominican nun in 1931 and currently on the process for beatification since 2004.

== Biography ==
=== Youth ===
Epstein was born on 2 August 1875 to a wealthy Polish-Jewish family. She was the only child of Leon Józef Epstein, a banker and industrialist, and Maria Skarżyńska. On 22 August, she was baptized in the Parish Church of St. John the Baptist and St. John the Evangelist in Pilica as Maria Aniela Wiktoria. When her mother died, her father remarried with whom he had three sons. A year after the wedding, he was struck by paralysis and used a wheelchair for the rest of his life. Soon, in 1880, her parents moved to Kraków, where they lived in a classic tenement house at 32 Sławkowska Street, later the Badeni Palace. In her youth, she received a thorough education, learning foreign languages and the piano.

=== Nursing career ===
After the death of her parents, Epstein devoted herself entirely to caring for the needy, the poor and the sick. At the age of 20, she began to work in the field of charity in the Association of Ladies Economists, a section of the Association of Ladies of Charity of St. Vincent de Paul, which cared for the sick and the poor, providing them with material assistance, running a kitchen for them and sewing clothes, becoming its president in 1905. Five years later, she became a member of the Catholic Association of Polish Women in Kraków. She organized reading rooms and cheap kitchens for workers. With the help of the Daughters of Charity, the existing outpatient clinic was first renovated, where first aid was provided to those in need, and then a small hospital was set up there.

On 5 November 1911, on Epstein's initiative and with her financial support, the first nursing school in Poland was established in Kraków, where she became the director. During World War I, she joined the Red Cross to provide aid to the wounded, going to the front in the vicinity of Będzin and Olkusz. She worked in a first aid station, the legion hospital in Rabka, the epidemic hospital near Tarnów, and organized mobile medical units. On 17 September 1915, she was awarded the Imperial Diploma of the Red Cross, 2nd class, and the War Decoration.

In 1918, she resumed the activity of the nursing school, however, due to financial problems she had to close it in 1921. In 1919, she joined the Third Order of Saint Dominic. As a nurse, she participated in the Silesian Uprisings, for which she received an honorary diploma from Wojciech Korfanty on 15 September 1921.

Unable to come to terms with the closure of the school, Epstein interested the American Rockefeller Foundation in it, receiving its financial support in 1924, and from the Polish authorities permission to renovate and build the school, and established the Polish Association of Professional Nurses admitted to the International Council of Nurses. In December 1925, thanks to her efforts, the University School of Nurses and Hygienists was opened in Kraków where she became the director. She devoted much attention to the school, taking care of its financing and the spiritual and professional development of its students (she founded, among other things, a chapel there). Currently, the school building houses the Faculty of Health Sciences of the Institute of Nursing and Midwifery of the Jagiellonian University Medical College.

=== Dominican nun ===
On 1 January 1931, at the age of 55, Epstein resigned from her position as the headmistress of the university school in order to enter the cloistered monastery of the Dominican Sisters in Gródek, Kraków. On March 24, 1931, in the presence of her friend Cardinal Adam Stefan Sapieha, she put on the nun's habit and took the religious name Magdalena.

Epstein made her perpetual vows on 4 September 1936. Her health soon deteriorated, and in 1937, she underwent surgery to remove a lipoma from her leg, and then in 1942, she suffered paralysis on the left side of her body. Two years later, she broke her ribs in a fall.

She died under the care of the sisters after six years of illness on 6 September 1947 in the morning hours, with a reputation for holiness. She was buried at the Rakowicki Cemetery in Kraków in a common neo-Gothic brick tomb of the Dominican Fathers.

== Beatification ==
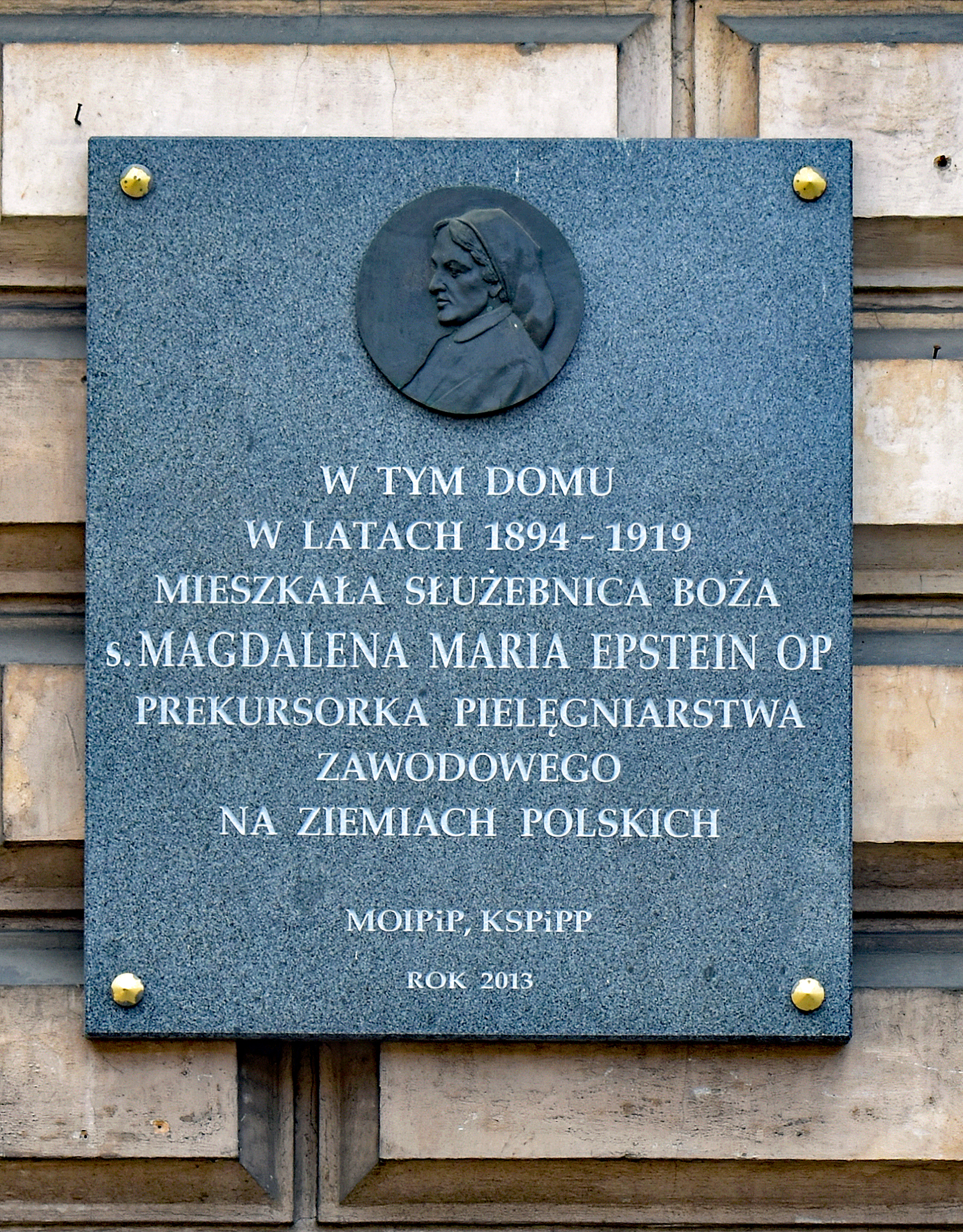
Epstein commemorative plaque, 7-9 Pijarska street, Old Town, Kraków, Poland.

Convinced of Epstein's holiness, after collecting documentation, the Dominican sisters turned to the Metropolitan of Kraków on 5 August 2003 with a request to raise her to the altars. On 30 September 2004, Cardinal Franciszek Macharski opened her beatification process in the Dominican Sisters' church in Gródek. From then on, she has the title of Servant of God. Then, a historical and theological commission was established to examine her life and documentation, and witnesses who had met her in the past were questioned. On 20 April 2007, in the Dominican Sisters' church in Kraków, the process was solemnly closed at the diocesan level by Cardinal Stanisław Dziwisz, after which the files of the process were transferred to the Dicastery for the Causes of Saints in Rome for further proceedings. On 28 November 2008, the Holy See issued a decree on the validity of the diocesan proceedings. Fr. Massimo Mancini OP was appointed the Postulator General.

== Commemoration ==
In 2009, the Dominican Sisters published an album about her life and work entitled Wierna Miłości. On 1 June 2011, one of the streets in her hometown of Pilica was named in her honor. On 12 March 2012, a special Sister Magdalena Epstein Foundation was established.
