= RV Profesor Siedlecki =

Polish research ship

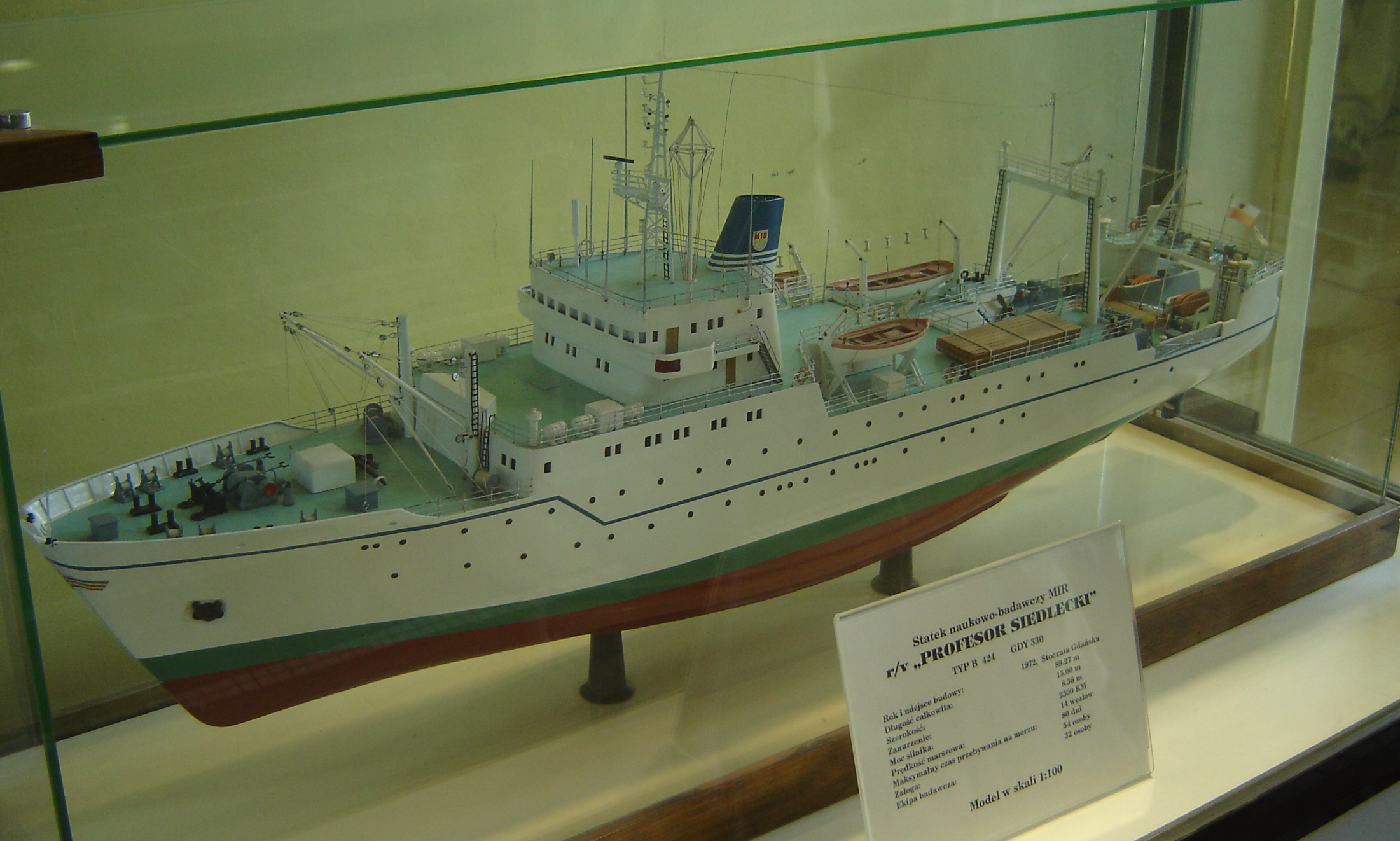
- A scale model

History

Poland
- Name: RV Profesor Siedlecki
- Namesake: Michał Marian Siedlecki, Polish biologist.
- Owner: Morski Instytut Rybacki (Sea Fisheries Institute)
- Builder: 'Stocznia Gdanska im. Lenina', Gdansk, Poland
- Laid down: 31 October 1970
- Identification: GDY-330; SQAC; IMO number: 7043518
- Fate: Sold for scrapping April 1992

General characteristics
- Class & type: project B-424 fishery research trawler
- Type: Fisheries research vessel
- Tonnage: 2798 gross register tons/997 net
- Length: 89.34 m (OA), 80.0 m (BP)
- Beam: 15.0 m (molded breadth)
- Propulsion: Diesel-electric - Three Fiat A 238V SS diesel engines rated at 1230 bhp each powering two 1560 kW motors
- Capacity: 53 crew + 33 research staff

RV Profesor Siedlecki was a Polish fishery research ship built to carry out research in the southern polar waters. The research was aimed at the fisheries off the Falkland Islands down to 57S. The ship was named after the Polish zoologist Professor Michał Siedlecki, who died in the Sachsenhausen concentration camp. Its first cruise took place in 1974. Further expeditions were captained by Miron Babiak. The ship was scrapped in 1992.
