= Estreicher =

The Estreichers were a family of notable humanists and scientists from Kraków, Poland, which included:

Dominik Oesterreicher
Alojzy Estreicher
Karol Estreicher (senior)
Stanisław Estreicher	Tadeusz Estreicher
Karol Estreicher (junior)	Zygmunt Estreicher
Stefan Estreicher

- Dominik Oesterreicher (1750–1809), painter and scholar of fine arts
- Alojzy Estreicher (1786–1852), botanist and entomologist, Dominik's son
- Karol Estreicher (senior) (1827–1908), historian of art and theater, literary critic and bibliographer, Alojzy's son
- Stanisław Estreicher (1869–1939), historian of law and bibliographer, Karol Senior's son
- Tadeusz Estreicher (1871–1952), chemist and historian, Karol Senior's son
- Maria Estreicherówna (1876–1966), teacher, writer, and translator, Karol Senior's daughter
- Karol Estreicher (junior) (1906–1984), historian of law, writer and bibliographer, Stanisław's son
- Stefan Karol Estreicher (1952–), theoretical physicist, Tadeusz's grandson

Other people with the same surname include:

- Samuel Estreicher (b. 1948), American jurist

== See also ==
- Österreicher (surname)
