= Stefan Karol Estreicher =

Theoretical physicist

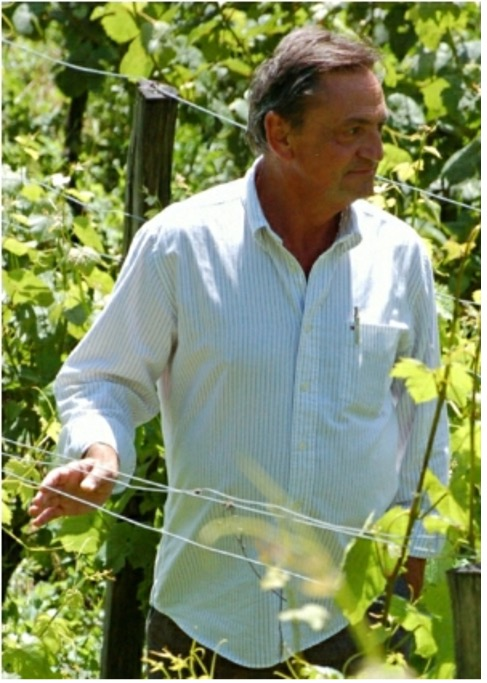
- Born: 6 May 1952 (age 74); Neuchâtel, Switzerland
- Parent: Zygmunt Estreicher
- Relatives: Tadeusz Estreicher (Grandfather) Karol Estreicher (senior) (Great Grandfather) Karol Estreicher (junior) (Uncle) Stanisław Estreicher (Great uncle)

Academic background
- Education: University of Zürich (PhD)

Academic work
- Institutions: Texas Tech University

Stefan Karol Estreicher is a theoretical physicist, currently serving as Paul Whitfield Horn Distinguished Professor Emeritus at the Physics Department of Texas Tech University in Lubbock, Texas.

== Education ==
He received his PhD from the University of Zurich in 1982 and joined the faculty of Texas Tech University in 1986.

== Academic Work ==
He was elected a Fellow of the American Physical Society in 1997 and a Fellow of the Institute of Physics (UK) in 2006. He won the Friedrich Wilhelm Bessel research award from the Alexander von Humboldt Society in 2001. He served for 6 years as the Chair of the International Steering Committee of the ICDS conferences series and, also for 6 years, as the elected Spokesperson of the P.W. Horn Distinguished Professors at Texas Tech University. He has published over 200 scientific papers dealing with the electrical, optical, and magnetic properties of defects in semiconductors. His studies of vibrational lifetimes revealed the concept of phonon trapping which provides a natural explanation for why and how defects reduce heat flow. He was the first to calculate from first-principles the Kapitza resistance and its temperature dependence at a semiconductor interface. He also published several articles on the history of wine and viticulture.

== Family ==
He is the son of Zygmunt Estreicher (professor of musicology), grandson of Tadeusz Estreicher (professor of chemistry and historian), great-grandson of Karol Estreicher senior (author of Bibliografia Polska), nephew of Karol Estreicher junior, and grand-nephew of Stanisław Estreicher.
