= Koy Tenement =

Koya Tenement
- Kamienica Koya
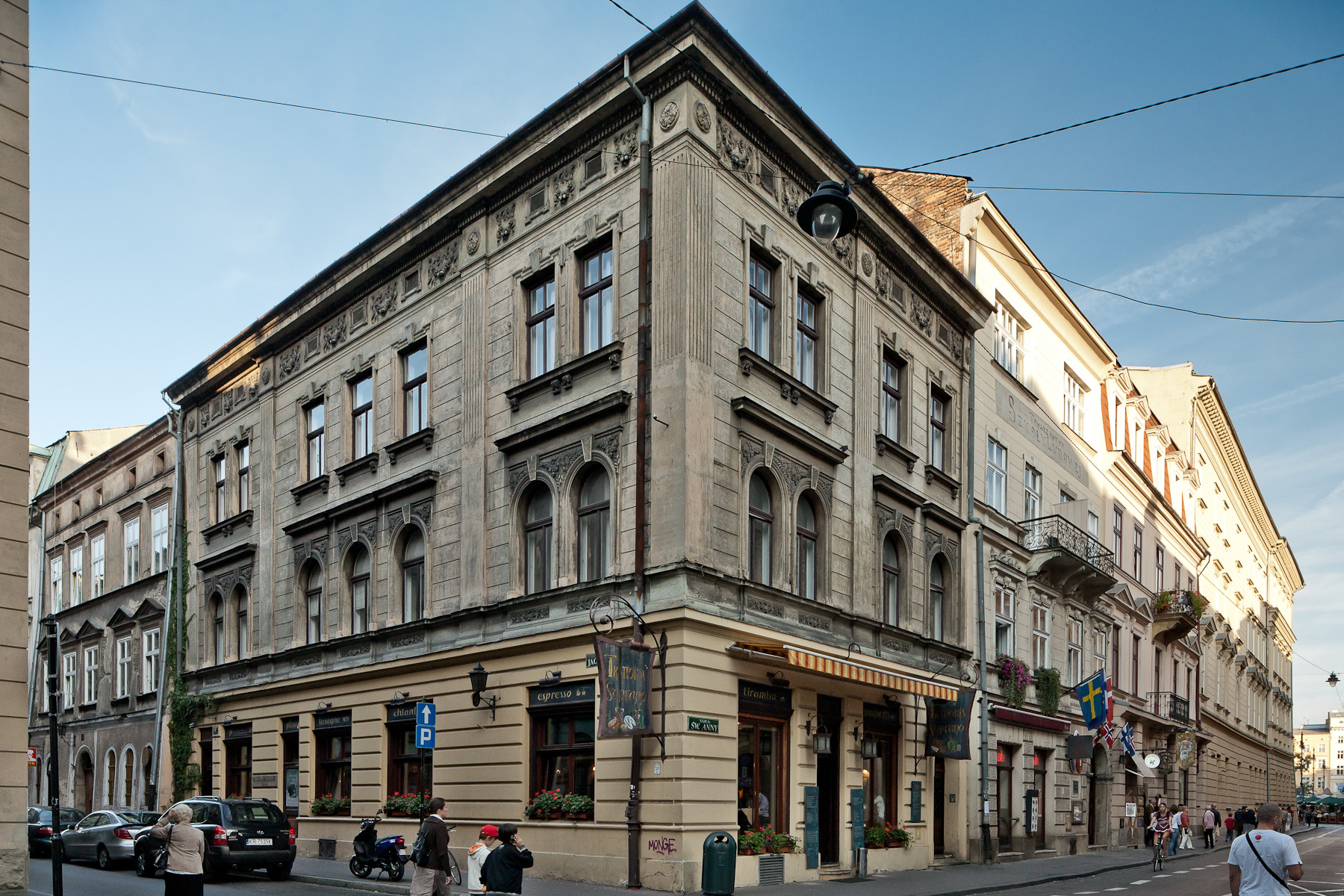

General information
- Address: 7 Świętej Anny Street; 14 Jagiellońska Street
- Town or city: Kraków
- Country: Poland
- Coordinates: 50°03′42.68″N 19°56′04.19″E
- Completed: 1900

Koya Tenement House (Polish: Kamienica Koya) is a tenement house located at 7 Świętej Anny Street on the corner with 14 Jagiellońska Street in Kraków in the District I Old Town.

== History ==
This two-story building features an ornately decorated facade. The windows on the ground and second floors are topped with rectangular moldings, while those on the first floor have semicircular arches.

The tenement was built in 1900 on the site of demolished Gothic structures. The architect Karol Scharoch designed the building. Starting in 1901, the premises housed W. Chmura’s dairy, and later the "Hajty" restaurant, which was acquired during World War I by M. and W. Kapusta. The restaurant became particularly popular among professors and students of Jagiellonian University at the time.

On December 7, 1987, the tenement was entered into the Registry of Cultural Property. It is also entered into the municipal register of monuments of the Lesser Poland Voivodeship.
