= Karol Estreicher =

Karol Estreicher may refer to:

- Karol Estreicher (senior) (1827–1908), historian of art and theater, literary critic and bibliographer
- Karol Estreicher (junior) (1906–1984), his grandson, historian of law, writer and bibliographer
