= Jagiellońska Street =

Jagiellońska Street may refer to:

- Jagiellońska Street, Bydgoszcz
- Jagiellońska Street, Kraków
