= Waldemar Raźniak =

Polish theatre and opera director (born 1982)

Waldemar Raźniak (born 1982 in Moscow) is a Polish theatre and opera director, actor and academic. From 2020 to 2024 he was director of the Helena Modrzejewska National Old Theatre in Kraków, one of Poland's national theatre institutions. He directs in theatre, music theatre and opera, and in radio drama; in 2025 he was awarded the title of professor of theatre and film arts.

== Education and academic career ==
Raźniak graduated in 2006 from the acting faculty of the Stanisław Wyspiański Academy of Theatre Arts in Kraków, and in the same year also completed a degree in cultural management at the Jagiellonian University. In 2010 he graduated in directing from the Aleksander Zelwerowicz National Academy of Dramatic Art in Warsaw, and trained on a directing internship at the Russian Institute of Theatre Arts (GITIS) in Moscow.

He received a doctorate in theatre arts from the Academy of Dramatic Art in 2013 and his habilitation in 2015; in 2025 he was awarded the title of professor in theatre and film arts. He was vice-dean of the acting faculty of the Academy of Dramatic Art from 2014 to 2015 and its dean from 2015 to 2016, and between 2016 and 2020 vice-rector of the academy for student affairs.

As dean of the acting faculty he set out to bring the tradition of Jerzy Grotowski more widely into practical actor training, working with Tomasz Rodowicz and the Chorea Theatre in Łódź; he described this experience in 2019 in Performer, the journal of the Grotowski Institute. In his later practice he has combined methods derived from Grotowski with Viewpoints and devised theatre techniques, describing this as a search for a bridge between Central European and Western theatre thinking.

== Career ==
=== Theatre ===
In 2024 Raźniak directed Mała Apokalipsa 20XX at the National Old Theatre, in a stage adaptation of Tadeusz Konwicki's novel that he co-wrote with Beniamin M. Bukowski. In 2026 he staged Zmierzch bogów at the Polski Theatre, Bydgoszcz, a stage version of the screenplay of Luchino Visconti's film The Damned, performed in the pump hall of the city's Waterworks Museum. Later the same year he directed Hamlet vs Makbet, based on plays by William Shakespeare, at the Teatr Mały in Tychy; the premiere took place on 11 April 2026.

=== Opera and music theatre ===
In 2015 he staged Joseph Haydn's Orlando paladino in a production prepared jointly by the Academy of Dramatic Art, the Fryderyk Chopin University of Music and the Academy of Fine Arts in Warsaw. His production of Karol Nepelski's opera Birdy was presented at the Tête-à-Tête festival in London in 2019.

In 2021 he wrote the libretto for and directed Bunkier. Fake Opera by Wojciech Błażejczyk, staged at the Warsaw Autumn festival of contemporary music and performed by the Hashtag Ensemble under Lilianna Krych.

At the Polish Royal Opera he directed the 2022 world premiere of Zygmunt Krauze's opera Noc kruków ("The Night of the Ravens"), to a libretto by Małgorzata Sikorska-Miszczuk. In 2025 he staged Handel's oratorio Il trionfo del Tempo e del Disinganno for the same company; the production opened on 4 April 2025.

In 2024 he wrote the scenario and libretto for and directed Solaris, an opera by Karol Nepelski after the novel by Stanisław Lem; it was performed by actors of the National Old Theatre together with the Hashtag Ensemble, a collective of instrumentalists and singers, under the music director Lilianna Krych. A co-production of the National Old Theatre with the Kraków festival Opera Rara, it was first performed in February 2024 in the SOLARIS National Synchrotron Radiation Centre of the Jagiellonian University.

=== Radio drama ===
Raźniak has directed radio plays and audio adaptations since 2017. For the publisher Audioteka these included Lem's Solaris (2017) and Powrót z gwiazd (2021), Ray Bradbury's Fahrenheit 451 (2018), Ken Follett's Fall of Giants (2020) and Yasmina Reza's God of Carnage (2021). In 2023 he wrote the script for and directed a radio adaptation of Stanisław Pagaczewski's Porwanie Baltazara Gąbki, produced by Radio Kraków in cooperation with the National Old Theatre.

== Directorship of the National Old Theatre ==
Raźniak was appointed director of the Helena Modrzejewska National Old Theatre on 6 October 2020, taking office the following day; his candidacy had been supported by the theatre's trade unions, artistic council and company. His programme for the 2020–2024 term announced stabilising the acting ensemble, cooperation with the unions, continuity of the artistic programme and the development of international co-productions. Towards the end of the term he directed two of his own productions at the theatre, Solaris and Mała Apokalipsa 20XX. He was succeeded on 1 September 2024 by Dorota Ignatjew.

== Critical reception ==
Reviewing Solaris for e-teatr.pl, the portal of the Zbigniew Raszewski Theatre Institute, the theatre historian Agnieszka Marszałek wrote that the music organised and dramatised the whole work and that the actors' speaking voices formed an integral part of its soundscape, approaching recitative and at times outright singing. She also wrote that the raw post-industrial interior of the Łaźnia Nowa Theatre, where she saw the production, lent itself to the imagined space of a decaying space station.

Writing in the weekly Przegląd, Bronisław Tumiłowicz described Il trionfo del Tempo e del Disinganno as bringing baroque music together with a contemporary stage frame built on the convention of a photographic studio. Before the premiere Raźniak had said that he was giving up illusionistic reconstruction in favour of a "dialogue with history".

Reviewing Bunkier. Fake Opera at the Warsaw Autumn festival for the music magazine Glissando, Jan Topolski described the production as immersive and wrote that its elements cohered into an exposition of its main themes, the loss of control and the blurring of truth.

== Awards ==
- 2023 – Irena and Tadeusz Byrski Award at the 22nd Dwa Teatry Festival of Polish Radio Theatre and Polish Television Theatre in Zamość, for the adaptation and direction of the radio play Porwanie Baltazara Gąbki.
- 2019 – Golden Mask for the best theatre event on the independent ("off") stage of the 2018/2019 season, for Tragedia Jana with the Chorea Theatre.

== Selected productions ==
- 2021 – Bunkier. Fake Opera by Wojciech Błażejczyk, Warsaw Autumn / Hashtag Ensemble
- 2022 – Noc kruków by Zygmunt Krauze, Polish Royal Opera
- 2024 – Solaris by Karol Nepelski, National Old Theatre / Opera Rara
- 2024 – Mała Apokalipsa 20XX after Tadeusz Konwicki, National Old Theatre
- 2025 – Il trionfo del Tempo e del Disinganno by Handel, Polish Royal Opera
- 2026 – Zmierzch bogów after Luchino Visconti, Polski Theatre, Bydgoszcz
- 2026 – Hamlet vs Makbet after Shakespeare, Teatr Mały, Tychy
