= Church of St. Anne, Kraków =

Roman Catholic church in Kraków, Poland

Church of St. Anne
- Kościół św. Anny
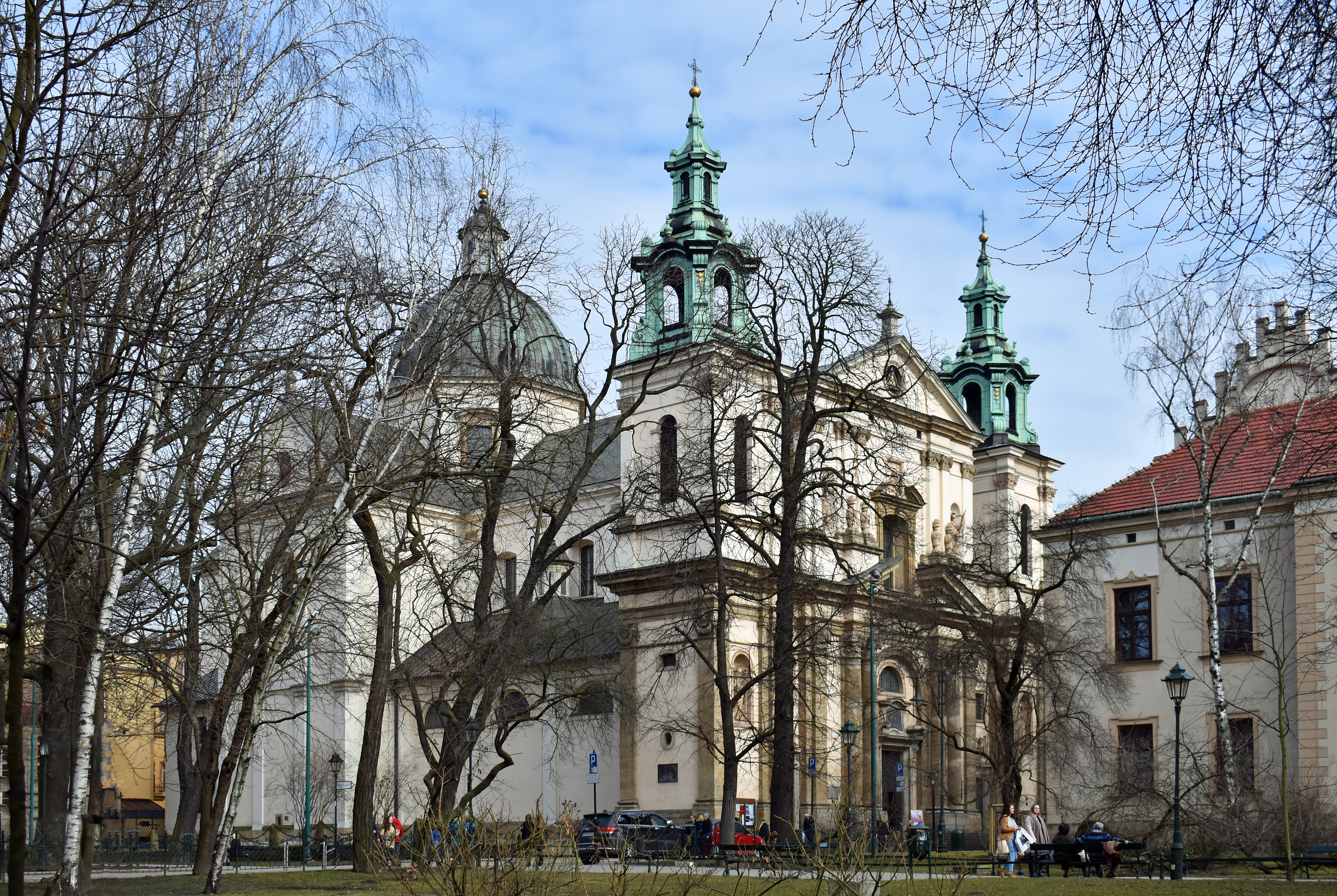
- Church of St. Anne
- 50°03′44.5″N 19°56′00.5″E
- Location: Kraków
- Address: 13 św. Anny Street
- Country: Poland
- Denomination: Roman Catholic

UNESCO World Heritage Site
- Type: Cultural
- Criteria: iv
- Designated: 1978
- Part of: Historic Centre of Kraków
- Reference no.: 29
- Region: Europe and North America

Historic Monument of Poland
- Designated: 1994-09-08
- Part of: Kraków historical city complex
- Reference no.: M.P. 1994 nr 50 poz. 418

The Church of St. Anne (Polish: Kościół św. Anny), is a historic Roman Catholic parish and university collegiate church located at 13 św. Anny Street in the Old Town of Kraków, Poland.

It is one of the leading examples of Polish Baroque architecture designed by Tylman van Gameren, but the church's history dates back to 14th century.

== History ==
The church was first mentioned in 1381 in the deed of donation of Sulisław I Nawoja of Grodziec. In 1407 the church was completely destroyed during a fire, but it was rebuilt the same year in the Gothic style by King Władysław II Jagiełło. The king also attached the Church formally to the Jagiellonian University by giving it the right to nominate the parish priest. In 1428 the choir was reconstructed and enlarged. By a charter dated 27 October 1535, St. Anne's was raised to the rank of a collegiate church.

In 1689 the Gothic edifice was demolished as it proved too small for the growing cult of Saint John Cantius, the patron saint of the Jagiellonian University who's laid to rest there. In 1689–1705 the new Baroque church was erected, modelled on Sant'Andrea della Valle in Rome. The architect was a Polonized Dutchman Tylman van Gameren, a chief architect at the court of John III Sobieski. The interior stucco decoration is the work of Baldassarre Fontana, and the polychromy assisted by painters and brothers Carlo and Innocente Monti and Karl Dankwart of Nysa. The painting of St. Anne in the high altar is the work of Jerzy Siemiginowski-Eleuter, court painter of King John III Sobieski. The 18th-century paintings in the stalls showing the life of Saint Anne are by Szymon Czechowicz. In the transept there is an altar of the adoration of the cross to the left, and the tomb of John Cantius to the right.

== Gallery ==
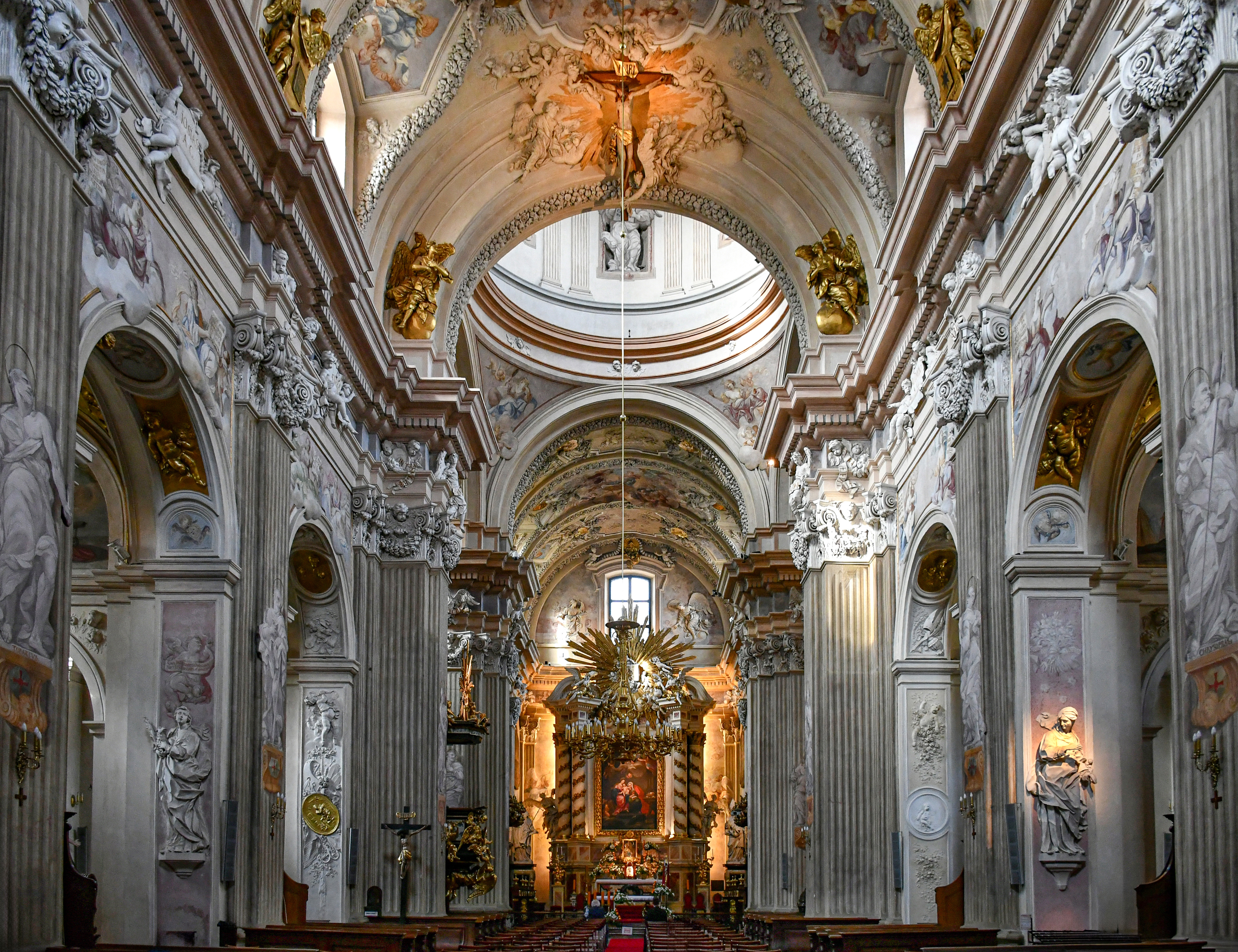
Interior of St. Anne's Church, main nave

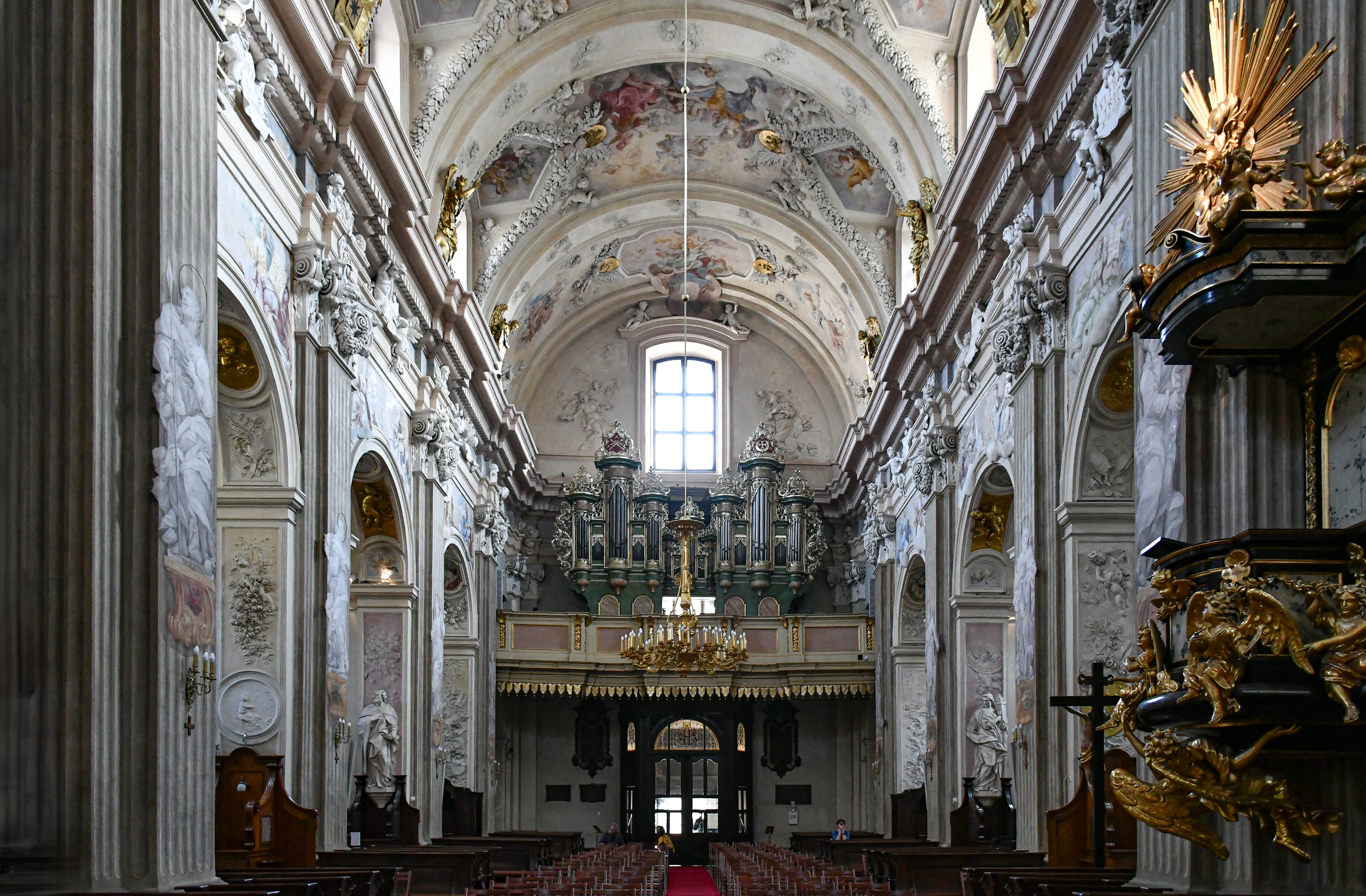
Choir and organ

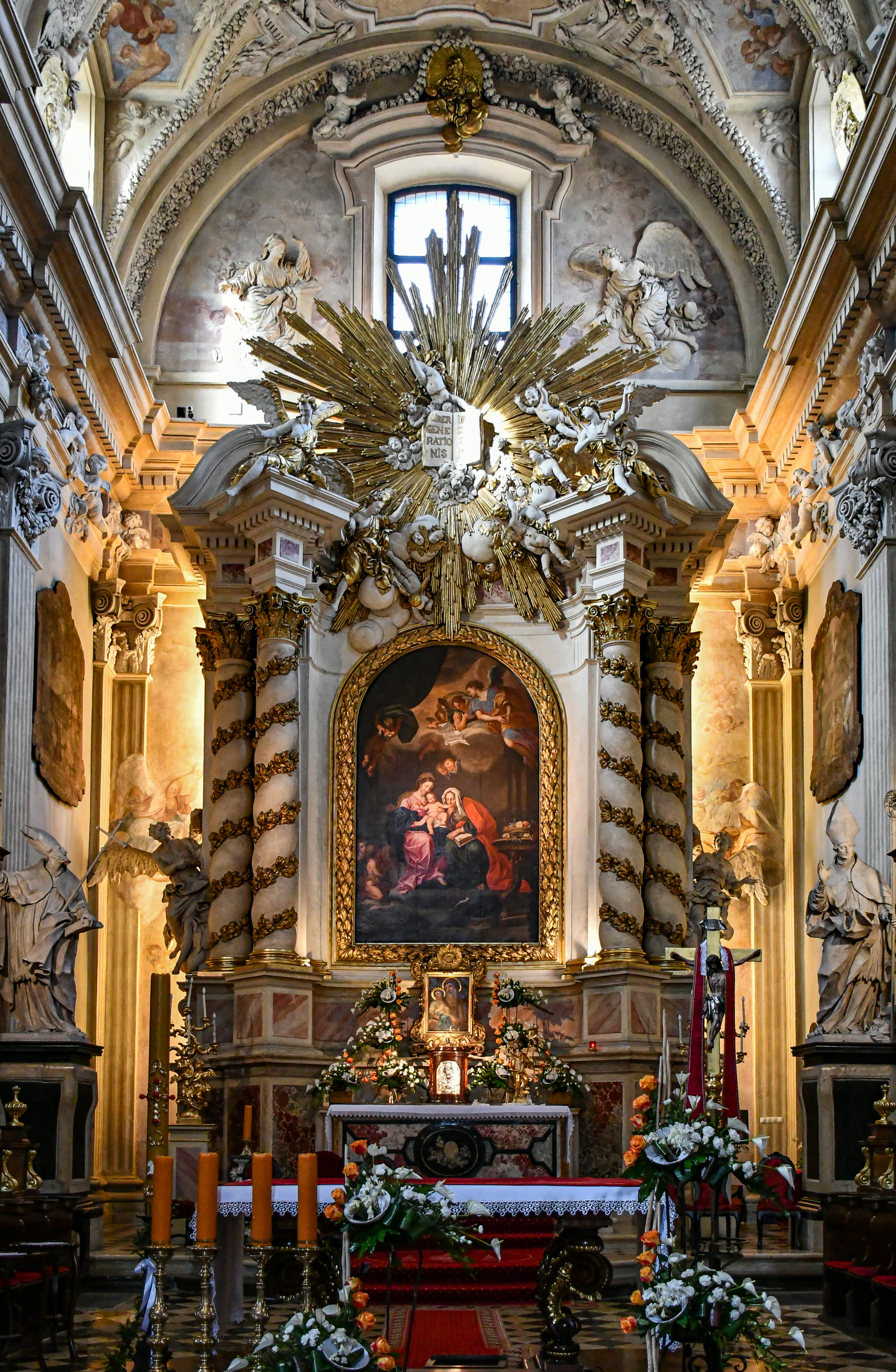
Main altar

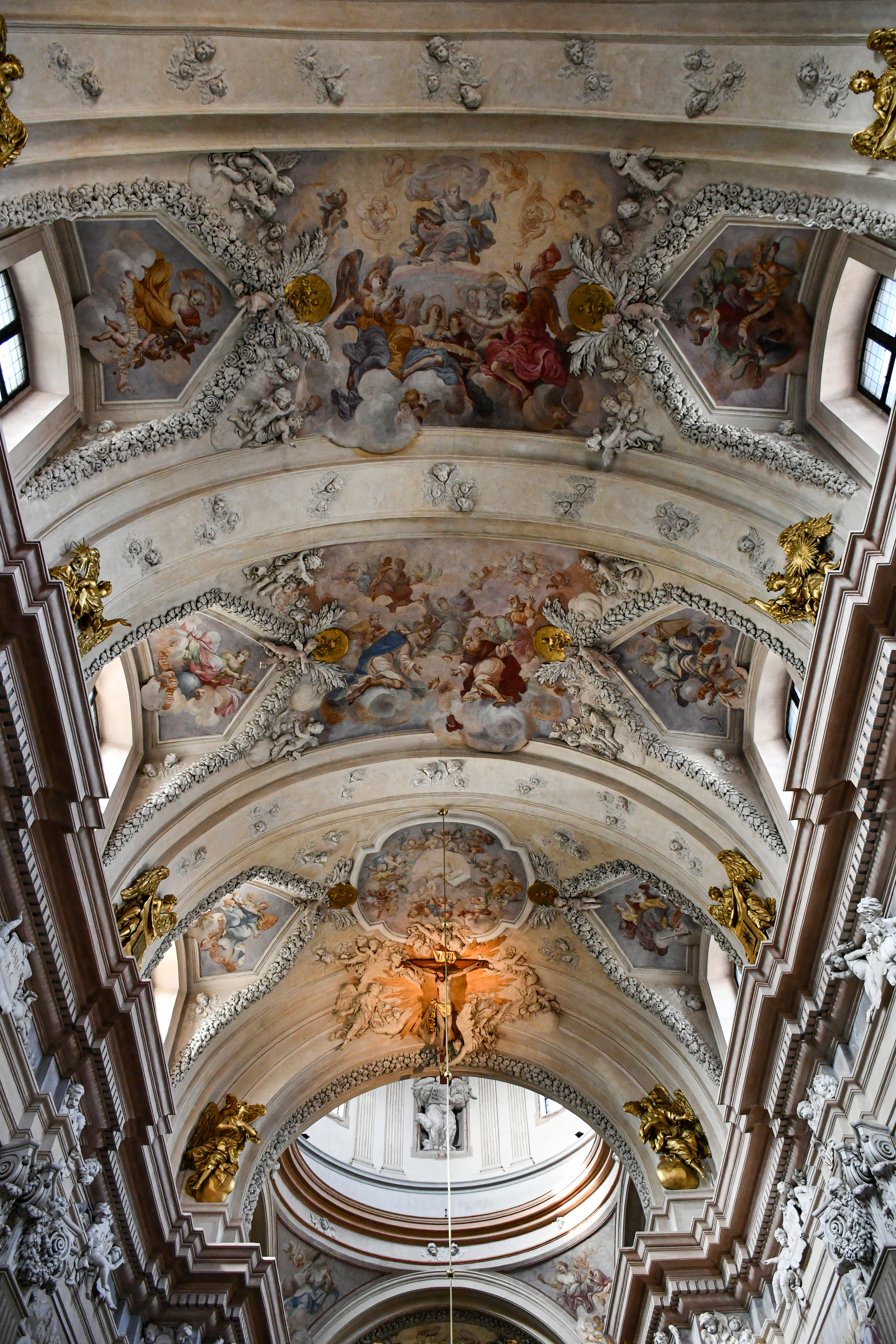
Vault

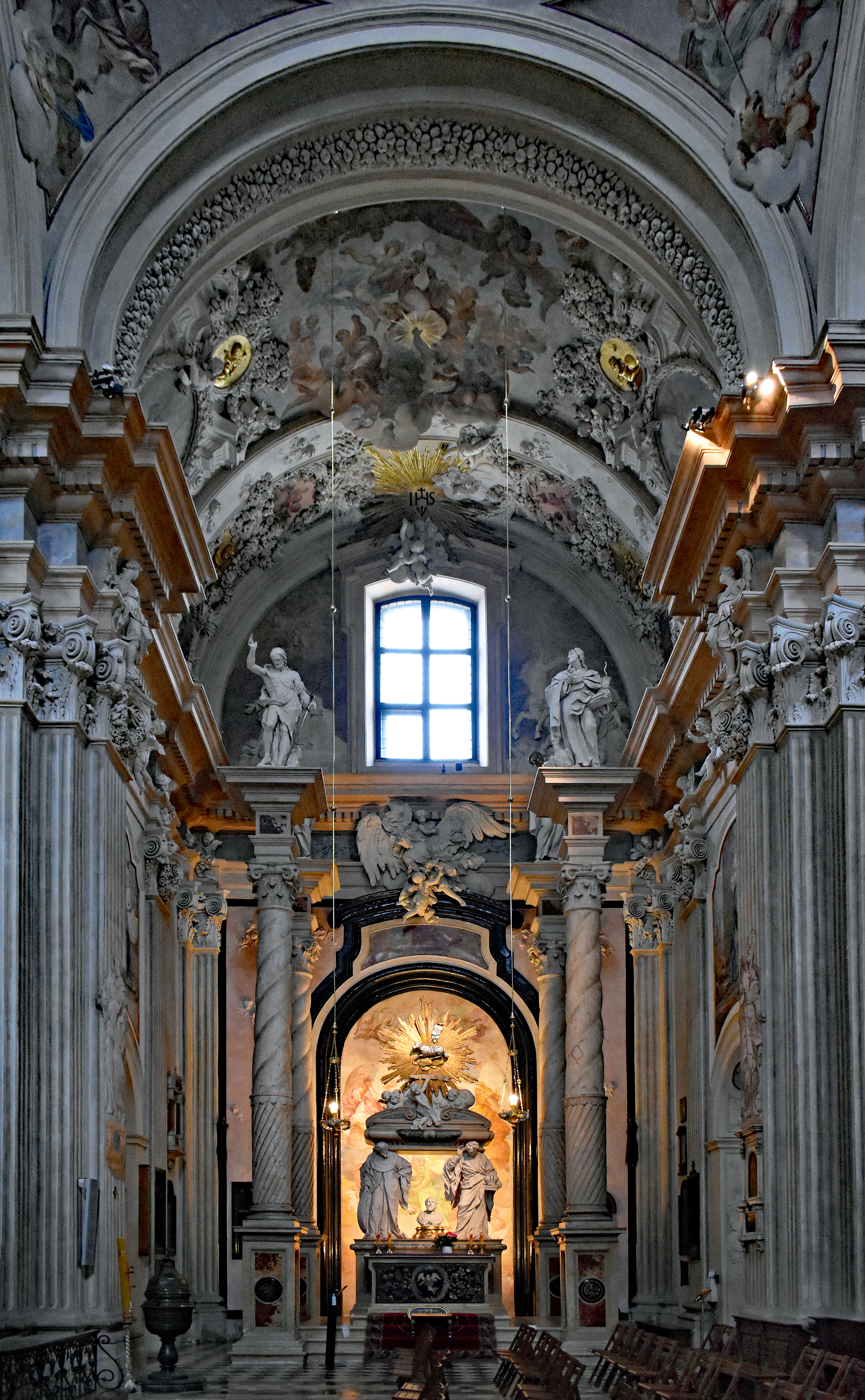
Right semitransept and tomb of St. John Cantius

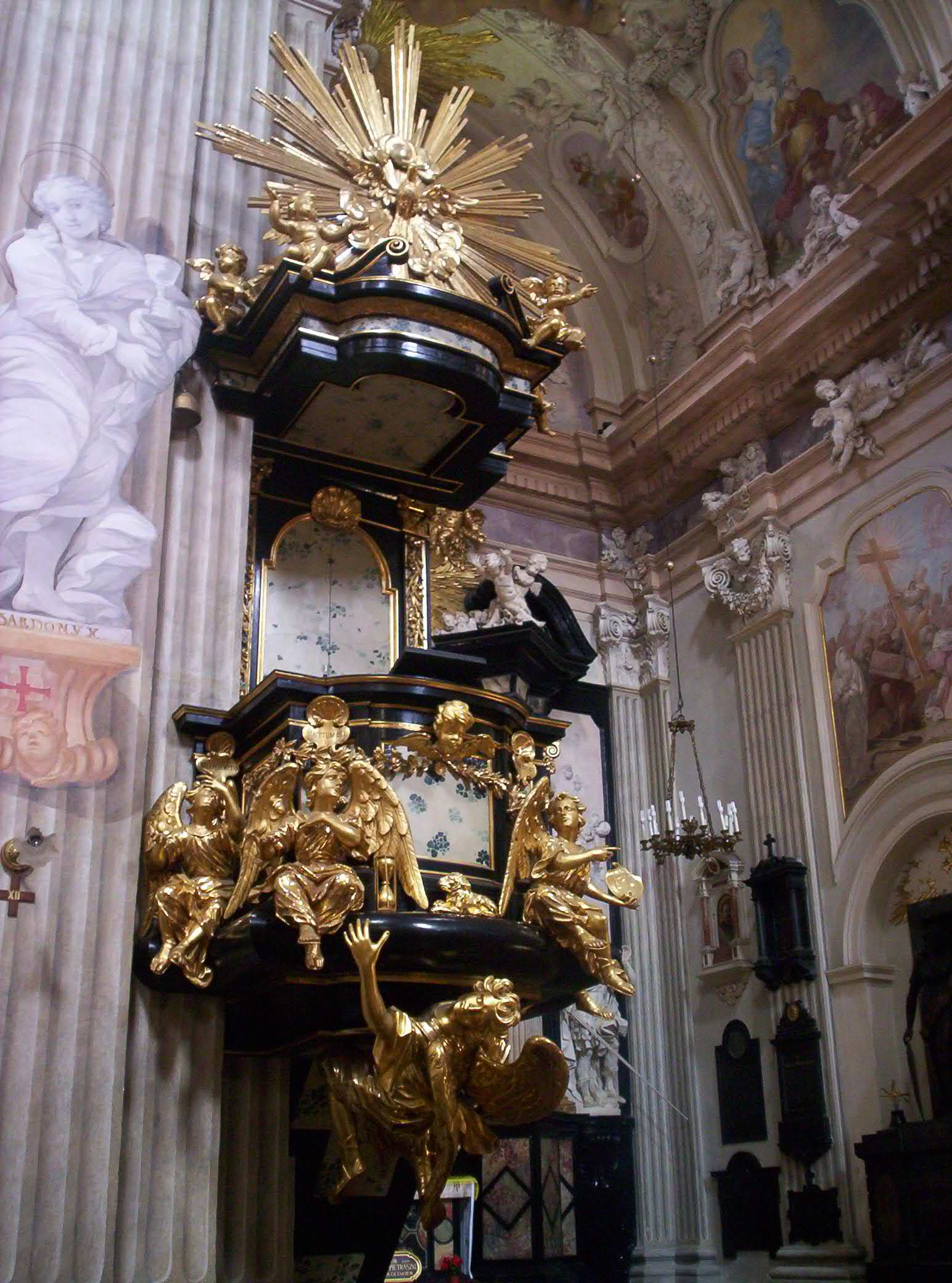
Pulpit

== Literature ==
- Watkins, Richard (2006). Best of Krakow. Lonely Planet. pp. 64 pages. ISBN 978-1-74104-822-3.
- (in Polish) * Michał Rożek, Barbara Gądkowa Leksykon kościołów Krakowa, Wydawnictwo Verso, Kraków 2003, ISBN 83-919281-0-1 pp 14-17 (Lexicon of Krakow churches)
- (in Polish) * Praca zbiorowa Encyklopedia Krakowa, wydawca Biblioteka Kraków i Muzeum Krakowa, Kraków 2023, ISBN 978-83-66253-46-9 volume I pp 738-739 (Encyclopedia of Krakow)
