= Helena Modrzejewska National Old Theatre =

Theatre in Kraków, Poland

- Narodowy Stary Teatr im. Heleny Modrzejewskiej
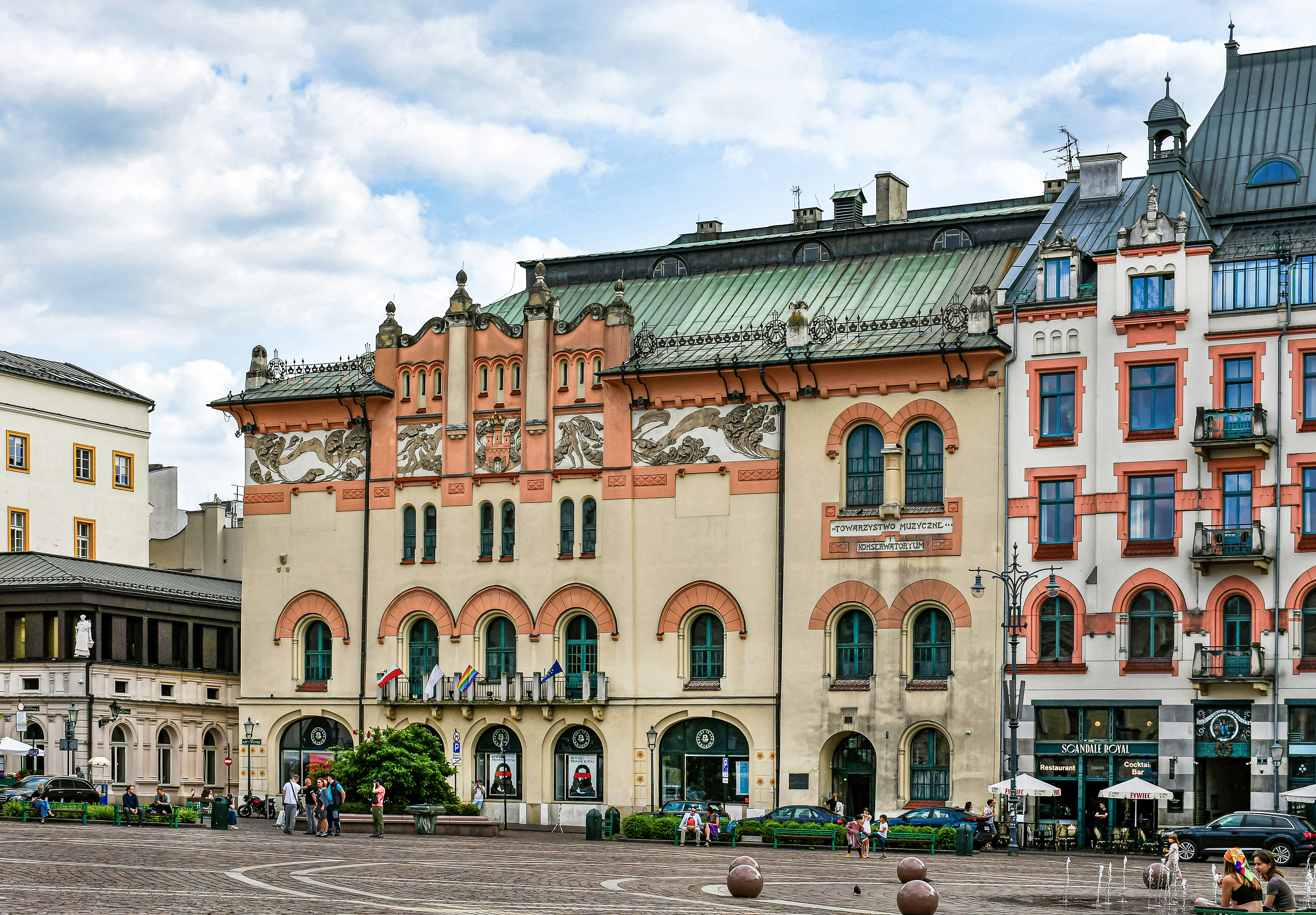
- View from Szczepański Square
- Interactive map of Helena Modrzejewska National Old Theatre
- Address: 5 Jagiellońska Street; Kraków; Poland
- Coordinates: 50°03′47.5″N 19°56′07″E

Construction
- Opened: October 20, 1781; 245 years ago
- Years active: 1781–present
- Architects: Étienne Humbert (1781); Karol Kremer, Tomasz Majewski (1841); Tadeusz Stryjeński, Franciszek Mączyński (1903–1906)

Website
- https://stary.pl/en/

UNESCO World Heritage Site
- Type: Cultural
- Criteria: iv
- Designated: 1978
- Part of: Historic Centre of Kraków
- Reference no.: 29
- Region: Europe and North America

Historic Monument of Poland
- Designated: 1994-09-08
- Part of: Kraków historical city complex
- Reference no.: M.P. 1994 nr 50 poz. 418

The Helena Modrzejewska National Old Theatre (Polish: Narodowy Stary Teatr im. Heleny Modrzejewskiej) a historic theater located at 5 Jagiellońska Street in the Old Town of Kraków, Poland.

It is one of the oldest public stages in Poland and a national institution of culture, first opened in 1781. It was named after renowned Shakespearean actress Helena Modrzejewska.

== History ==
The theatre was created by Feliks Oraczewski, a member of the Polish Parliament (Sejm), and the actor Mateusz Witkowski. On 17 October 1781 the Kraków city authorities gave Witkowski permission to perform comedy under the condition that he pay fifty Polish zloty a month to the municipal treasury. In 1798, Jacek Kluszewski, the starosta of Brzeg, took over the theatre and converted two of his own buildings the corner of Szczepański Square and Jagiellonian Street into its permanent home.

The theatre is regarded as Poland's leading theatre. In 1997 Krystyna Meissner became the director. Her term here was difficult and the following year she left at the request of the actors.

In 2016, the MICET Interactive Museum / Theatre Education Centre opened in the theatre building's 13th century cellars. From 2020 to 2024 the theatre was headed by Waldemar Raźniak. Since 1 September 2024 the theatre has been headed by Dorota Ignatjew, an actress and director who had previously run the Juliusz Osterwa Theatre in Lublin (2016–2020) and the Nowy Theatre in Łódź.

Theatre's actors include Krzysztof Globisz and Dorota Segda. Collaborating actors include Anna Dymna, Jan Peszek and Anna Polony. Other collaborating actors included Edward Linde-Lubaszenko (died 2026).
