= Maria Estreicherówna =

Polish teacher, writer, and translator (1876–1966)

- Born: December 18, 1876; Kraków, Austria-Hungary
- Died: October 11, 1966 (aged 89); Kraków, Poland
- Occupations: Teacher, writer, translator

Maria Estreicherówna (December 18, 1876 – October 11, 1966) was a Polish teacher, writer, and translator.

== Biography ==
Maria Estreicherówna was born in Kraków. She came from the well-known Kraków-based Estreicher family; she was the daughter of Karol Estreicher, Senior, and the sister of Stanisław Estreicher and Tadeusz Estreicher. She was one of the first women in Poland to hold a doctoral degree in philosophy and English studies. She was known for her social activism. She died in Kraków and is buried in Rakowicki Cemetery in Kraków, in the family tomb.

== Works ==
Estreicherówna published historical works, including the book Życie towarzyskie i obyczajowe Krakowa w latach 1848-1863 (Society and Customs in Kraków, 1848–1863) and the article "Z dziejów krakowskich konspiracji" (The History of Kraków Conspiracies, as Rocznik Krakowski, vol. 30). She produced numerous translations, including of English poetry.
