= Świętej Anny Street, Kraków =

Street in Kraków, Poland

Świętej Anny Street
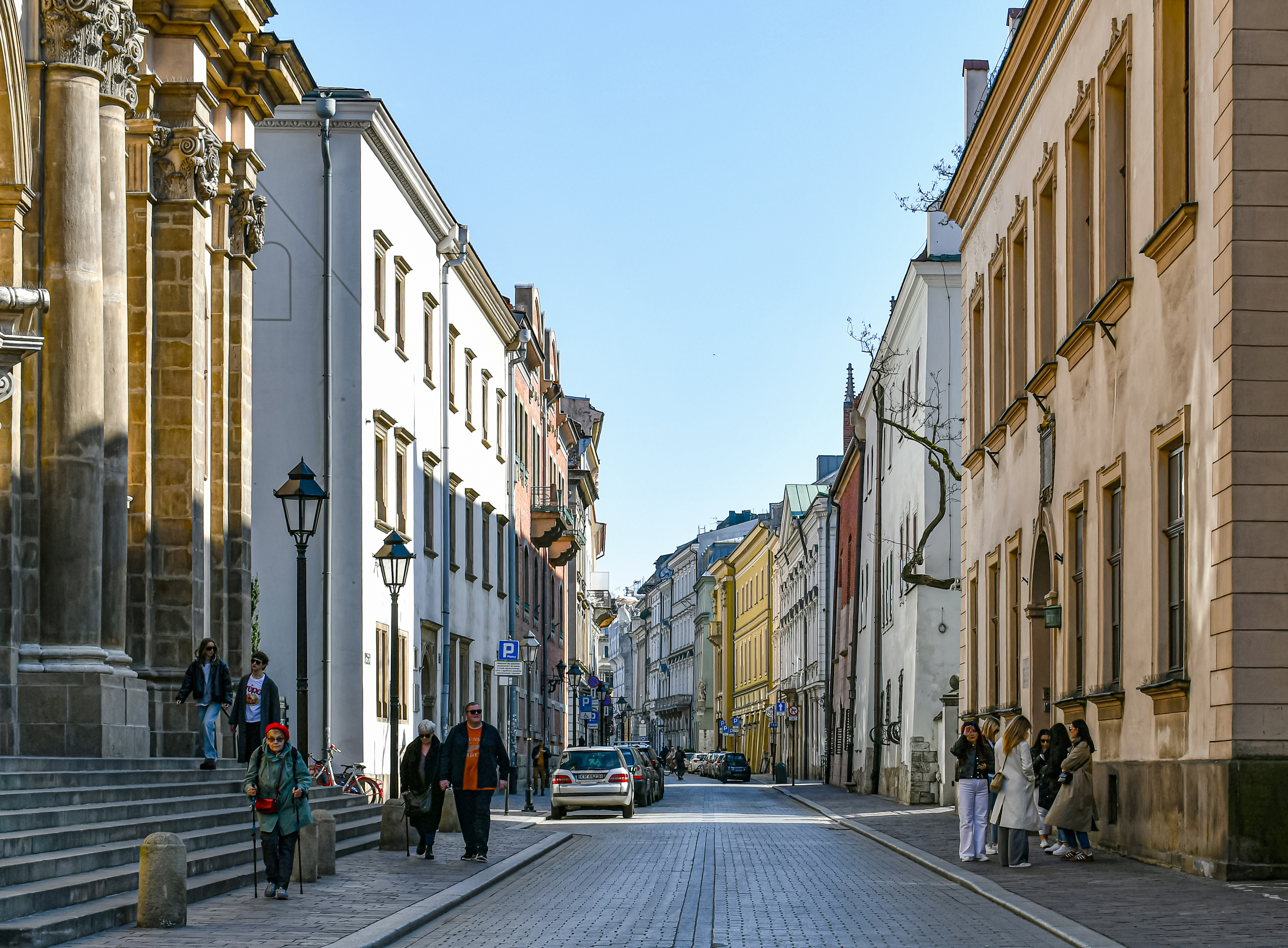
- View towards the east, with the Church of St. Anne (left)

- Native name: ulica Świętej Anny (Polish)
- Length: 280 m (920 ft)
- West end: Podwale Street, Studencka Street
- East end: Main Market Square

UNESCO World Heritage Site
- Type: Cultural
- Criteria: iv
- Designated: 1978
- Part of: Historic Centre of Kraków
- Reference no.: 29
- Region: Europe and North America

Historic Monument of Poland
- Designated: 1994-09-08
- Part of: Kraków historical city complex
- Reference no.: M.P. 1994 nr 50 poz. 418

Świętej Anny Street (Polish: Ulica Świętej Anny, lit. St. Anne's Street) - a historic street in the Old Town of Kraków, Poland.

To the west, the street heads to a former Jewish quarter, hence its former name, Żydowska Street (Ulica Żydowska, lit. Jewish Street). Historically, the street saw the location of a synagogue, cemetery and a Jewish bath house until the fifteenth-century, when the Jewish population was moved to the north to the present location of Szczepański Square. The etymology of the street derives from the presence of the Church of St. Anne. The street features several university-related buildings, formerly housing colleges, dormitories and a library.

== Features ==
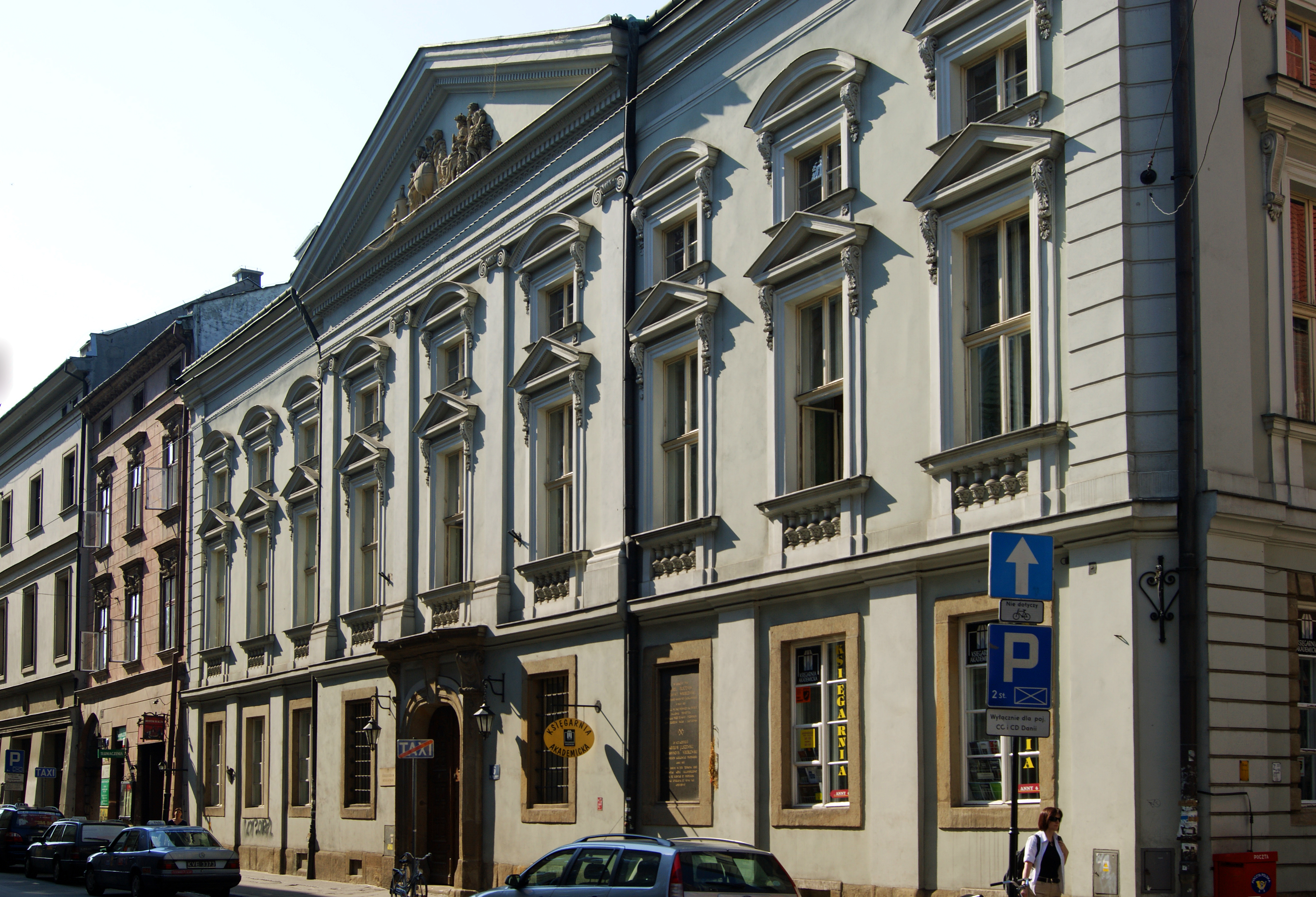
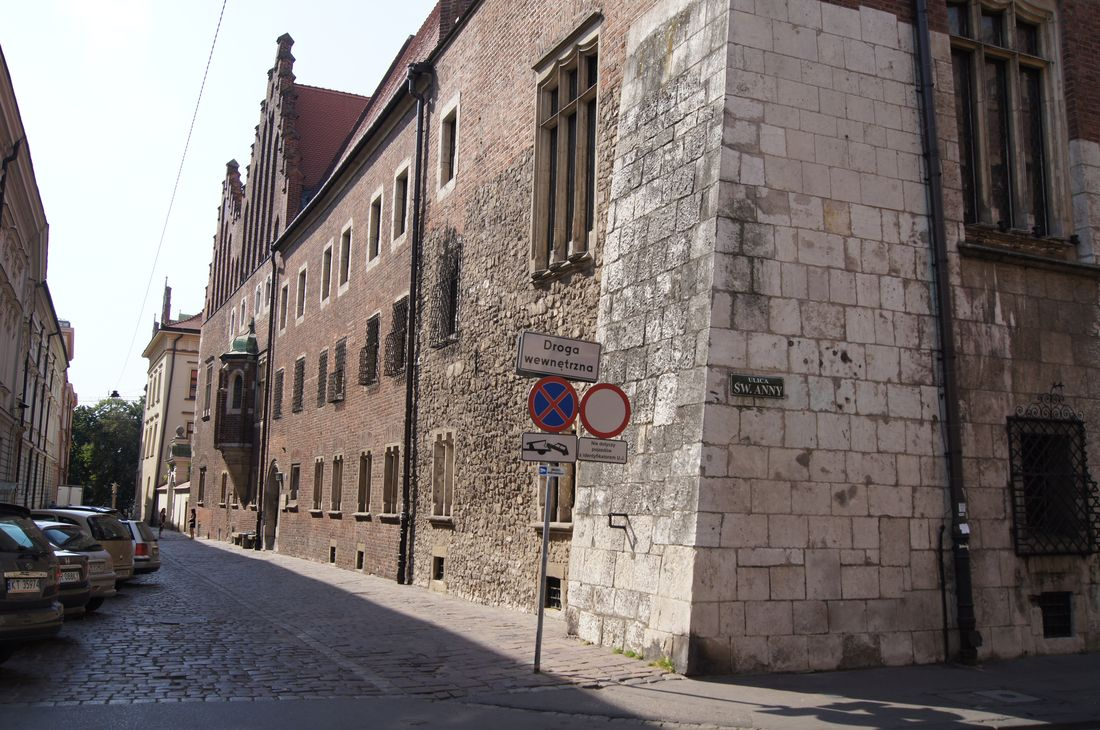
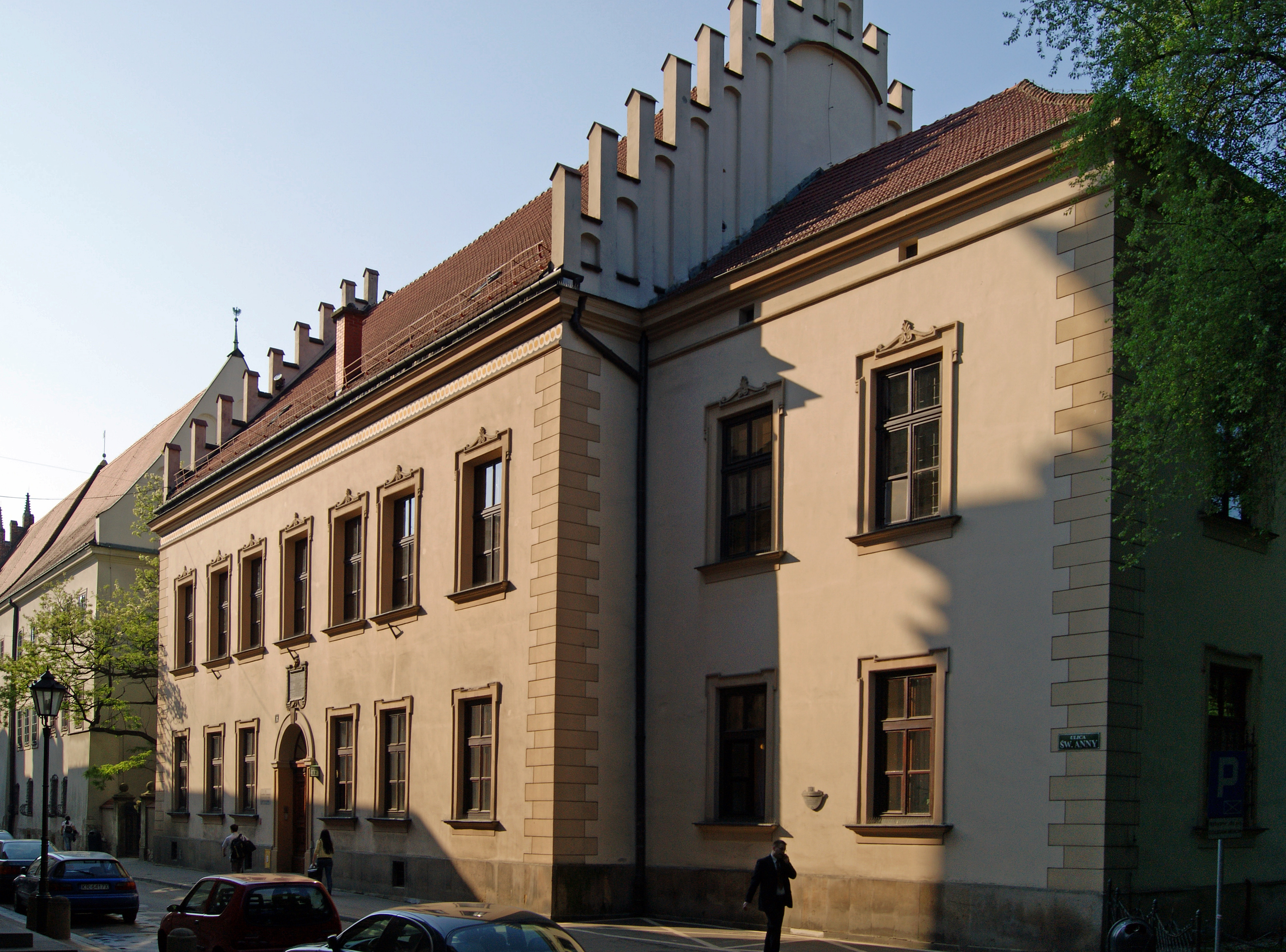
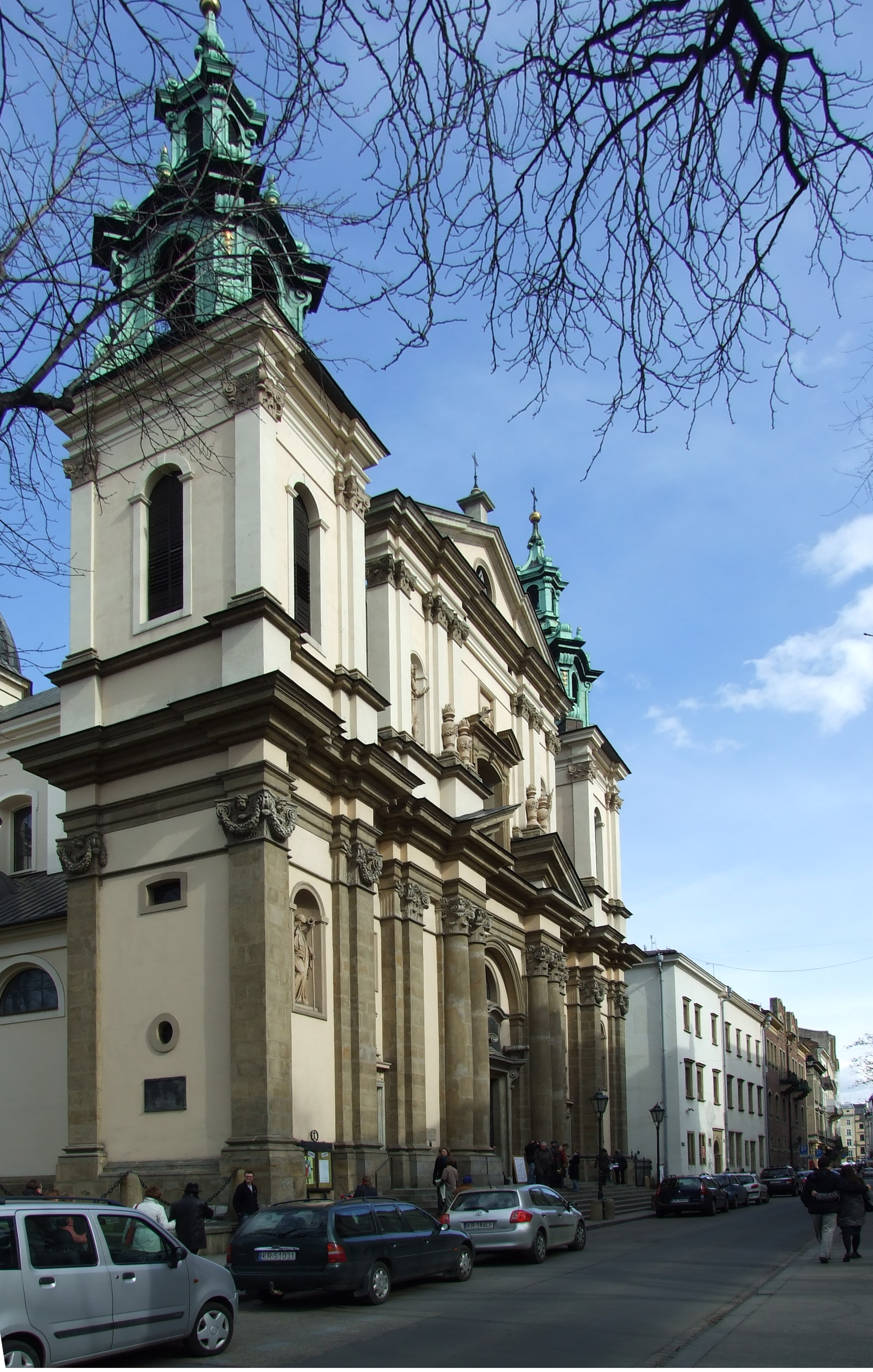
Street No.	Short description	Picture
6	Collegium Kołłątaja (Collegium Phisicum) - a Classicist building built between 1787 and 1791 to house the mathematics, nature, mechanics and hydraulics classes of the Jagiellonian University.
8-10	Collegium Maius - the oldest building of the Jagiellonian University, standing in the very centre of the former university quarter.
12	Collegium Nowodworskiego (Collegium Medicum) - housing the Jagiellonian University Medical College.
13	Church of St. Anne - a church built in the Gothic architectural style according to architect Tylman van Gameren's designs. The street owes its name to the church.
