= Alojzy Rafał Estreicher =

Polish physician and naturalist

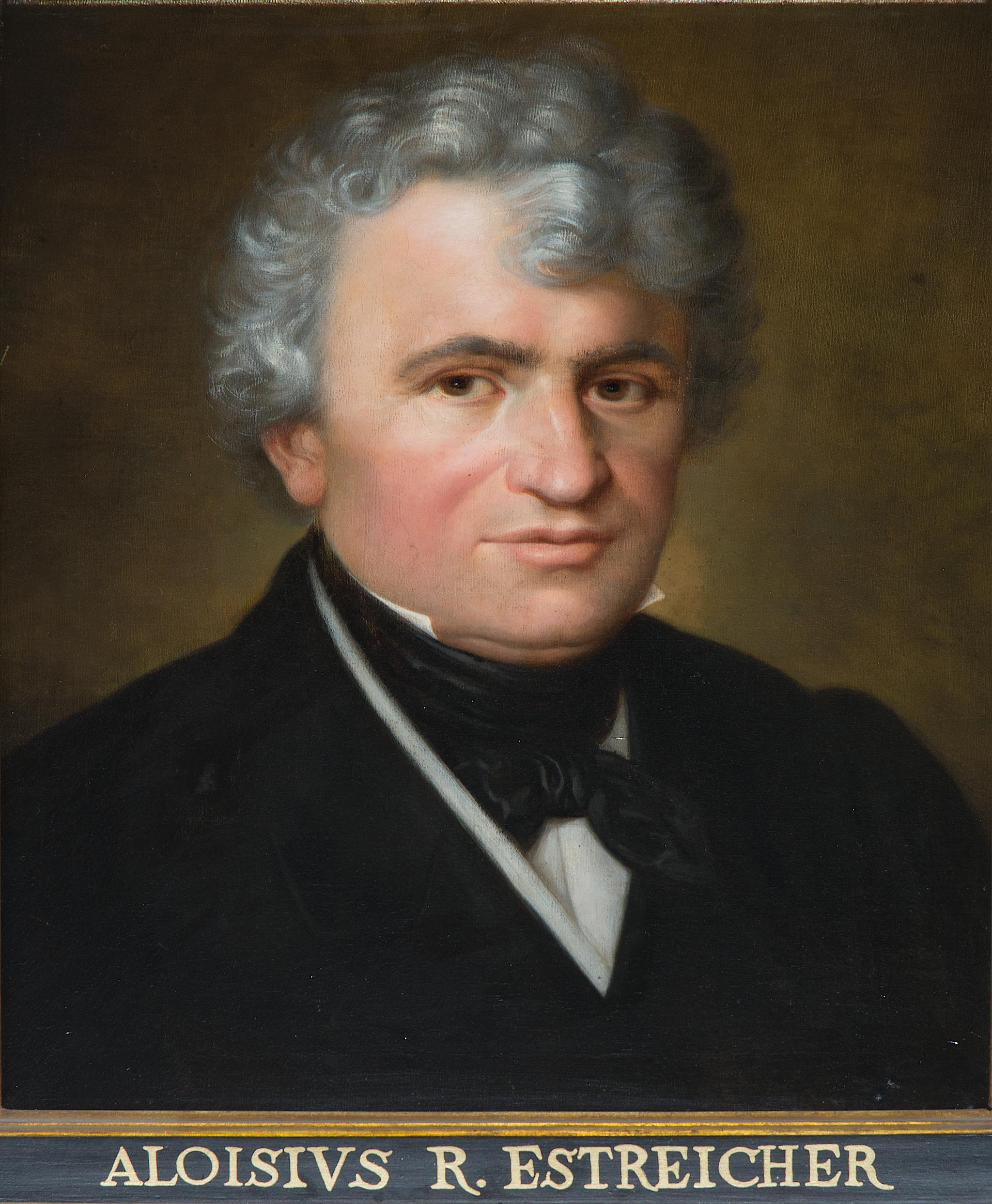
Portrait probably by J. Szynalewski, c. 1880

Alojzy Rafał Estreicher or Alois Raphael Estreicher (21 June 1786 – 1 August 1852) was a Polish physician and naturalist who contributed to botany and entomology. He served as a professor of natural history at the University of Krakow. A species of beetle that he discovered was named after him as Carabus estreicheri.

== Life and work ==
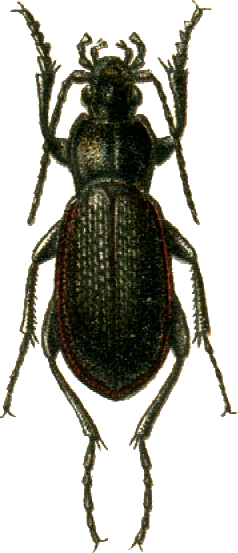
Carabus estreicheri

Estreicher was born in Krakow where his father Dominik Franciszek Paulo Oesterreicher (1750–1809) was an art professor and amateur entomologist. His mother was Rozalia née Prakesch (1761–1807). He Polonized the family name of Oesterreicher to Estreicher. He studied medicine at the University of Krakow from 1802 and received a surgery degree in 1805. He then taught veterinary medicine for a while. He studied museum practices at the University of Vienna. In 1807 he received a doctorate in medicine and a doctor of philosophy in 1811. From 1809 he was in charge of the botanical garden of Krakow where he reorganized its collections, established an alpinarium (1836), an arboretum (1818) and a tropical greenhouse in 1826–1827. After showing his support for the November Uprising, he faced repression for some years. He was a professor of natural history from 1832 and served in the University of Krakow until his retirement in 1843. His students included Ignacy Rafał Czerwiakowski, Stanisław Dembosz, Erazm Majewski, and Józef Riedmüller.

Estreicher travelled widely in Galicia and across Europe along with others. He participated in the congresses of naturalists in Berlin in 1828 and in Vienna in 1832. He climbed Mont Blanc and Vesuvius. During his travels, he collected plant specimens and beetles, nearly 31000 of the latter. From his collections Carabus estreicheri was described and named by Gotthelf Fischer von Waldheim in 1820.

Estreicher married Antonina née Rozbierska, daughter of a Lviv professor belonging to Lithuanian nobility. They had seven children including the philologist Karol Estreicher (1827–1908).
