= Collegium Maius, Kraków =

Museum, building of the Jagiellonian University, Kraków

Coordinates: 50°03′42″N 19°56′02″E

Jagiellonian University Collegium Maius
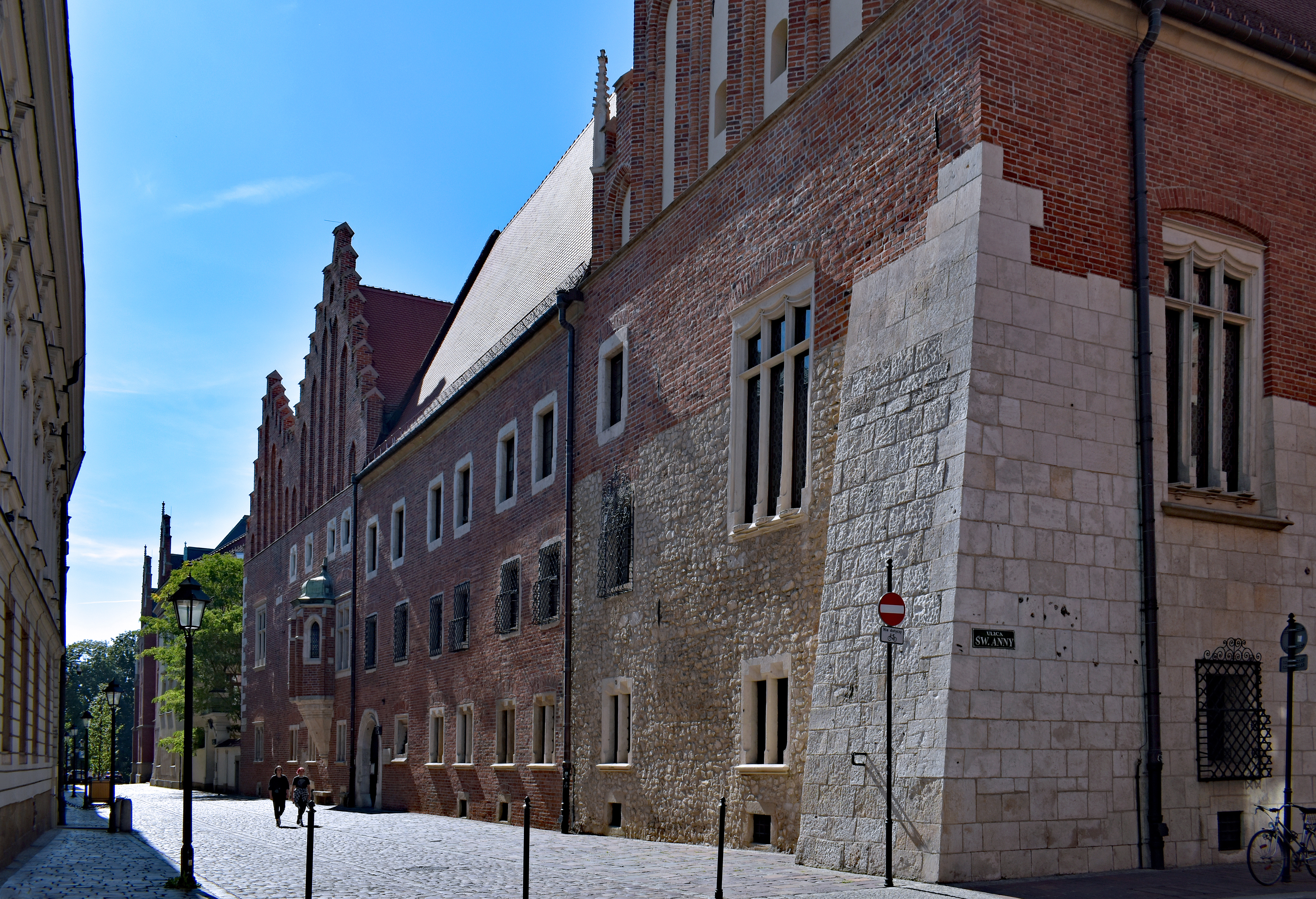
- Collegium Maius building. View from Jagiellońska Street.
- Established: 1949-64 (after restorations)
- Location: 15 Jagiellońska Street; Kraków, Poland
- Website: https://maius.uj.edu.pl/en_GB
- Studium Generale

History
- Founder(s): Władysław II Jagiełło; Jadwiga of Poland

Architecture
- Architectural type: Polish Gothic manor
- Completed: 1364

Specifications
- Materials: Stone, brick and mortar

UNESCO World Heritage Site
- Type: Cultural
- Criteria: iv
- Designated: 1978
- Part of: Historic Centre of Kraków
- Reference no.: 29
- Region: Europe and North America

Historic Monument of Poland
- Designated: 1994-09-08
- Part of: Kraków historical city complex
- Reference no.: M.P. 1994 nr 50 poz. 418

The Collegium Maius (Latin for "Great College") located in Kraków Old Town, Poland, is the Jagiellonian University's oldest building, dating back to the 14th century. It stands at the corner of ulica Jagiellońska (Jagiellon Street) and ulica Świętej Anny (St. Anne Street) near the Main Square of the historic city centre. Collegium Maius is the location of the Jagiellonian University Museum (Polish: Muzeum Uniwersytetu Jagiellońskiego), a registered museum established on the initiative of Prof. Karol Estreicher after meticulous restorations which lasted from 1949 through 1964, bringing the edifice back to its original look from before 1840.

== History ==
The then 36-year-old first university in Poland, known at the time as Akademia krakowska (English: the Krakow Academy), moved into the building some time in the 14th century after King Władysław II Jagiełło had purchased it as an educational grant with funds bequeathed by his late wife, Queen Jadwiga.

The Collegium Maius was rebuilt in the late 15th century as a late-Gothic structure surrounding a large courtyard bordered with arcades. In 1517 a well was built in the center of the courtyard. Professors lived and worked upstairs, while lectures were held downstairs.

In the 1490s the Collegium Maius counted among its students Nicolaus Copernicus, the Renaissance astronomer and polymath who would revolutionize European ideas about the universe.

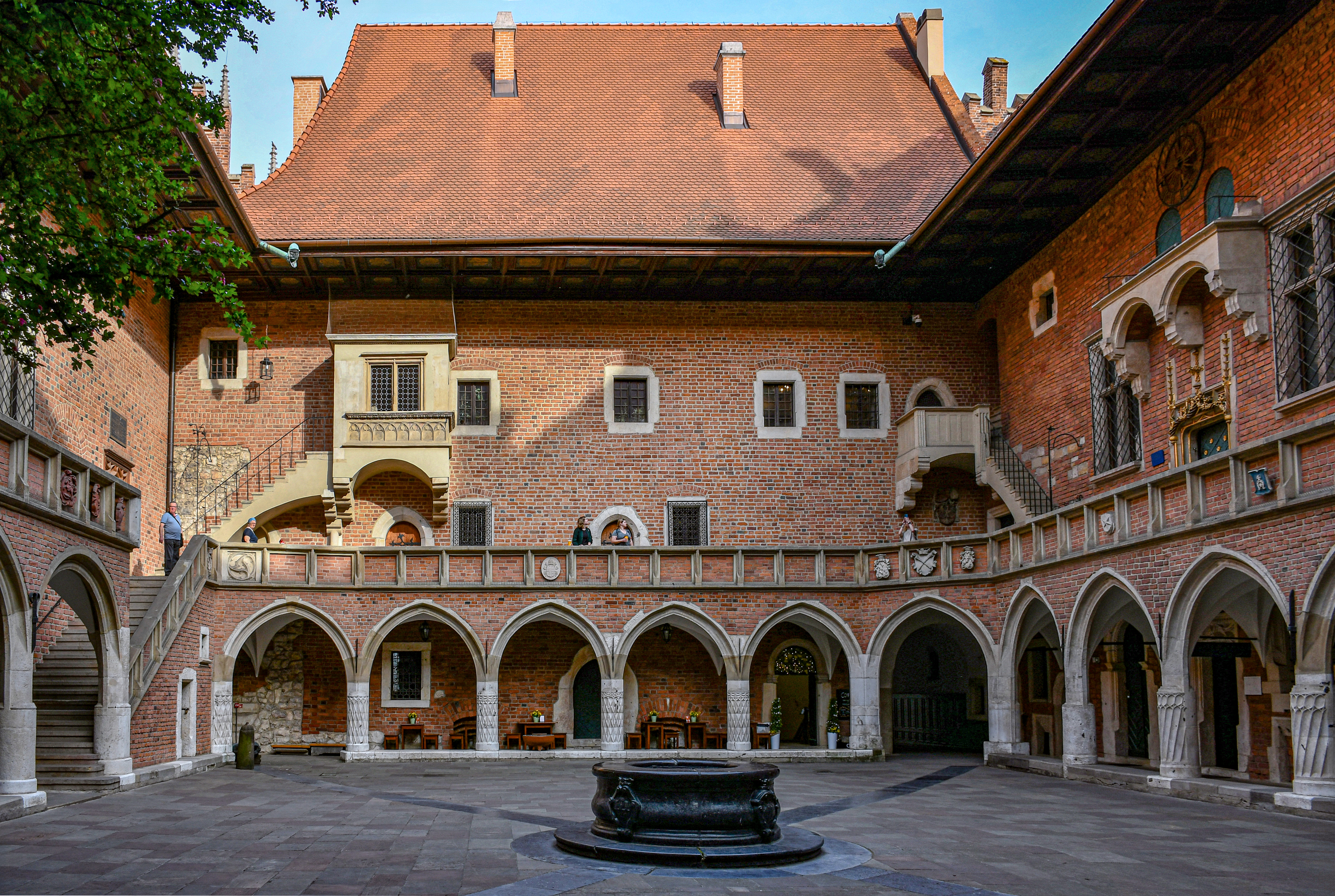
Courtyard

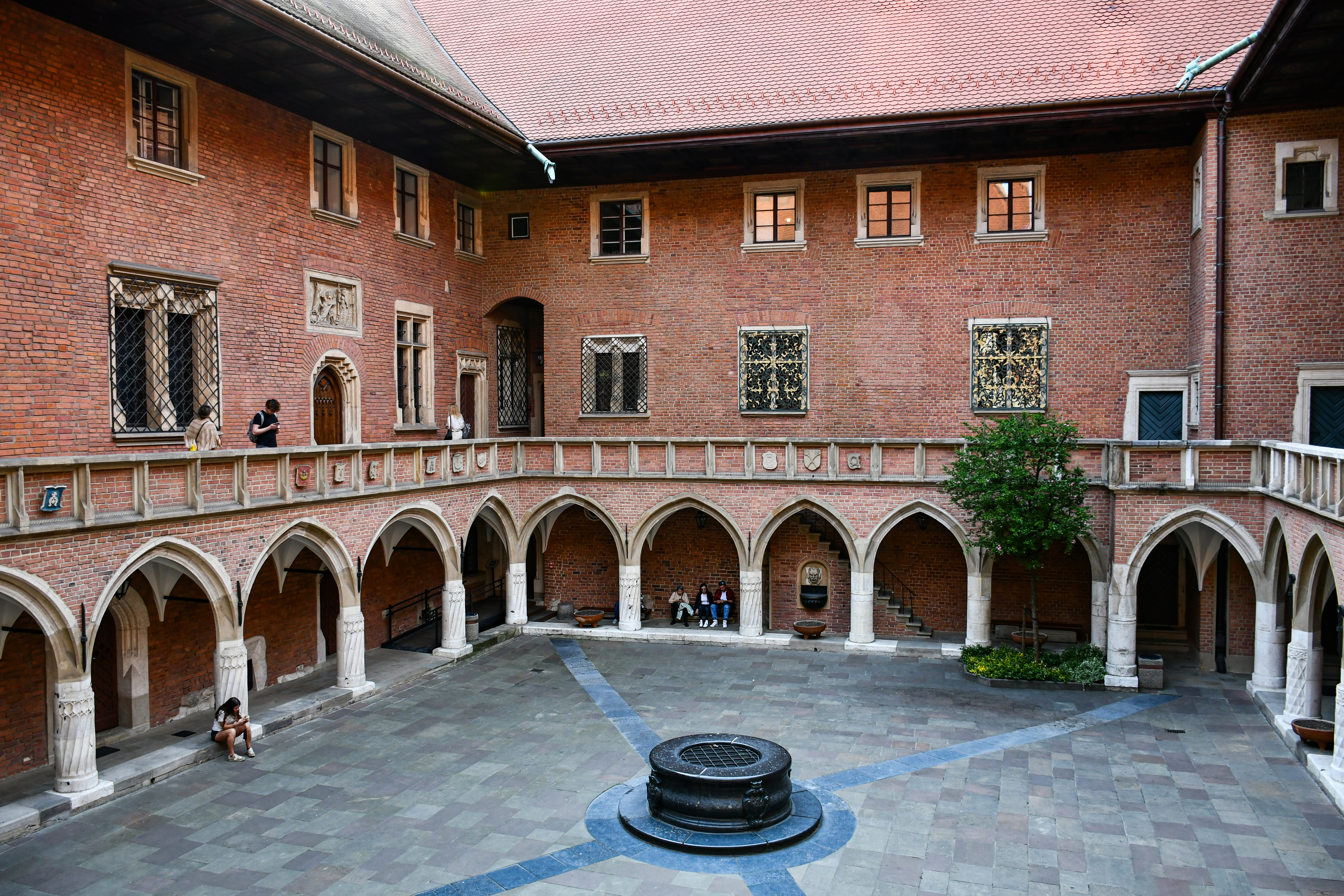
Courtyard

The clock (plays music daily at 9:00, 11:00, 13:00, 15:00 and 17:00)

== Cultural significance ==
The Collegium Maius Museum features lecture rooms, communal halls, professors’ quarters, a library and a treasury containing rectors' Gothic maces and the Jagiellonian globe. Exhibits also include medieval scientific instruments, globes, paintings, collectibles, furniture, coins and medals.

Historic interiors and exhibition halls of the Collegium Maius
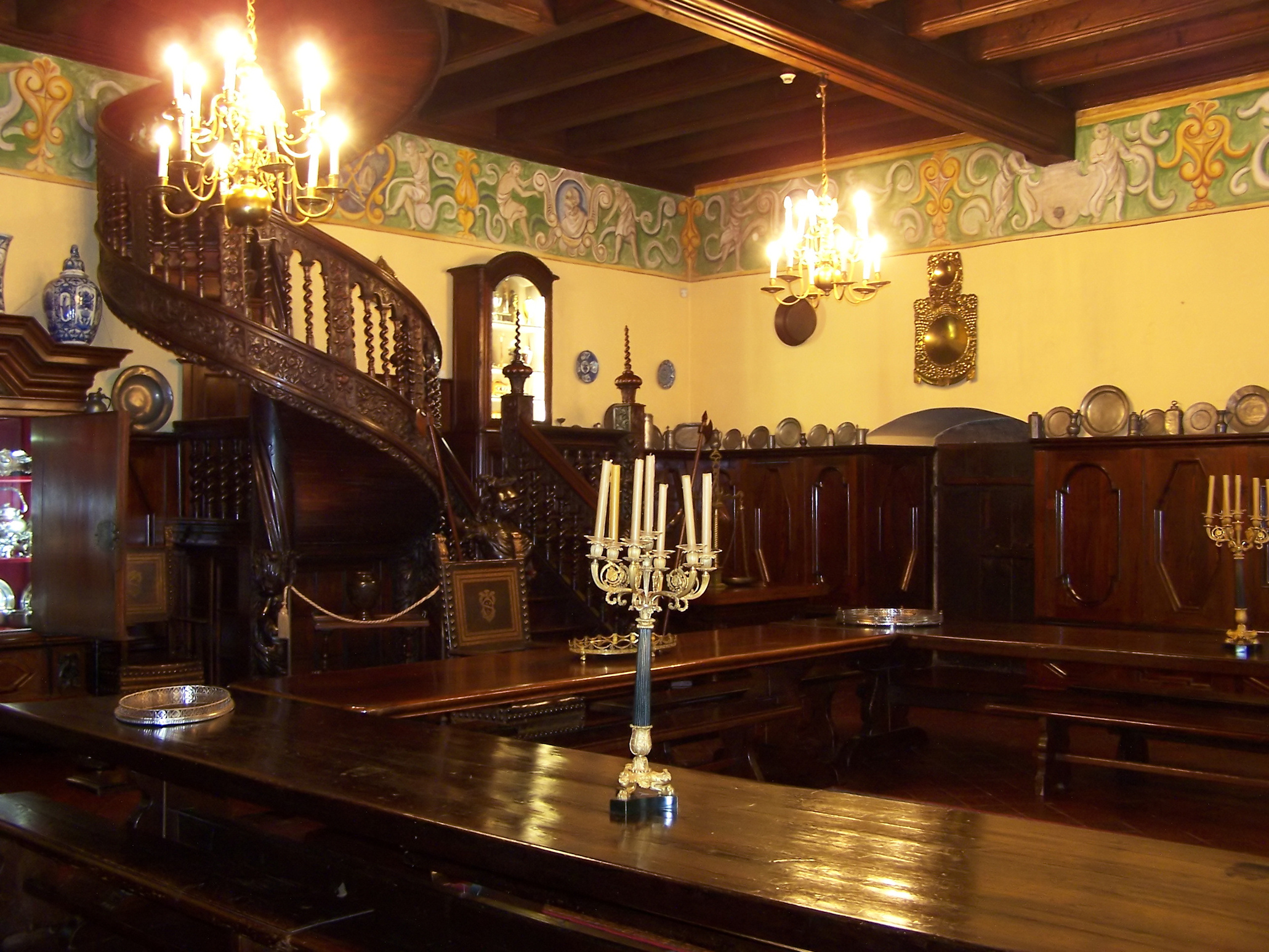
Stuba Communis (professors' common room) in the Collegium

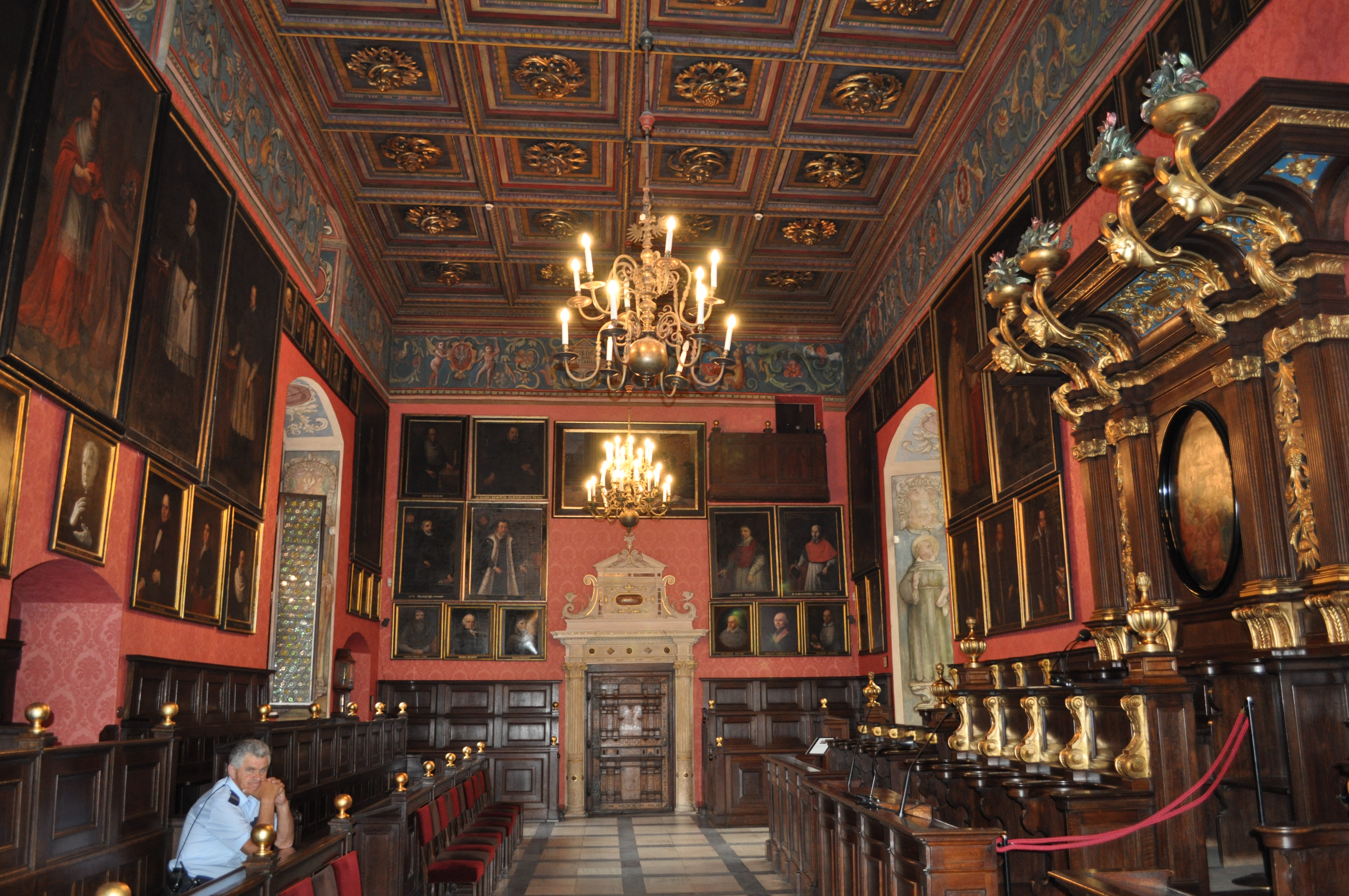
Collegium Maius Assembly Hall

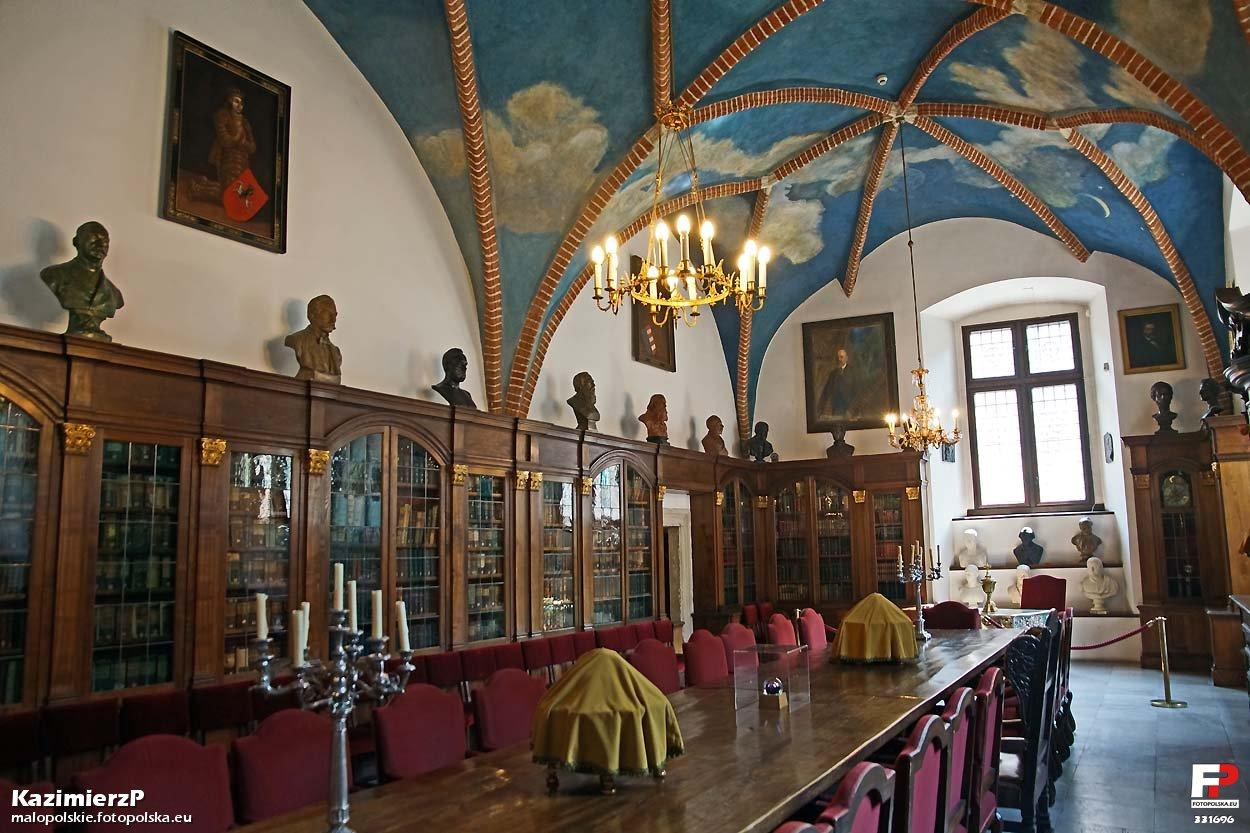
The Old Library Chamber

== Jagiellonian University Museum Directors ==
- Karol Estreicher (1951–1976)
- Stanisław Waltoś (1977–2011)
- Krzysztof Stopka (since 2012)

== See also ==
- Culture of Kraków
