= Stanisław Estreicher =

Polish historian (1869–1939)

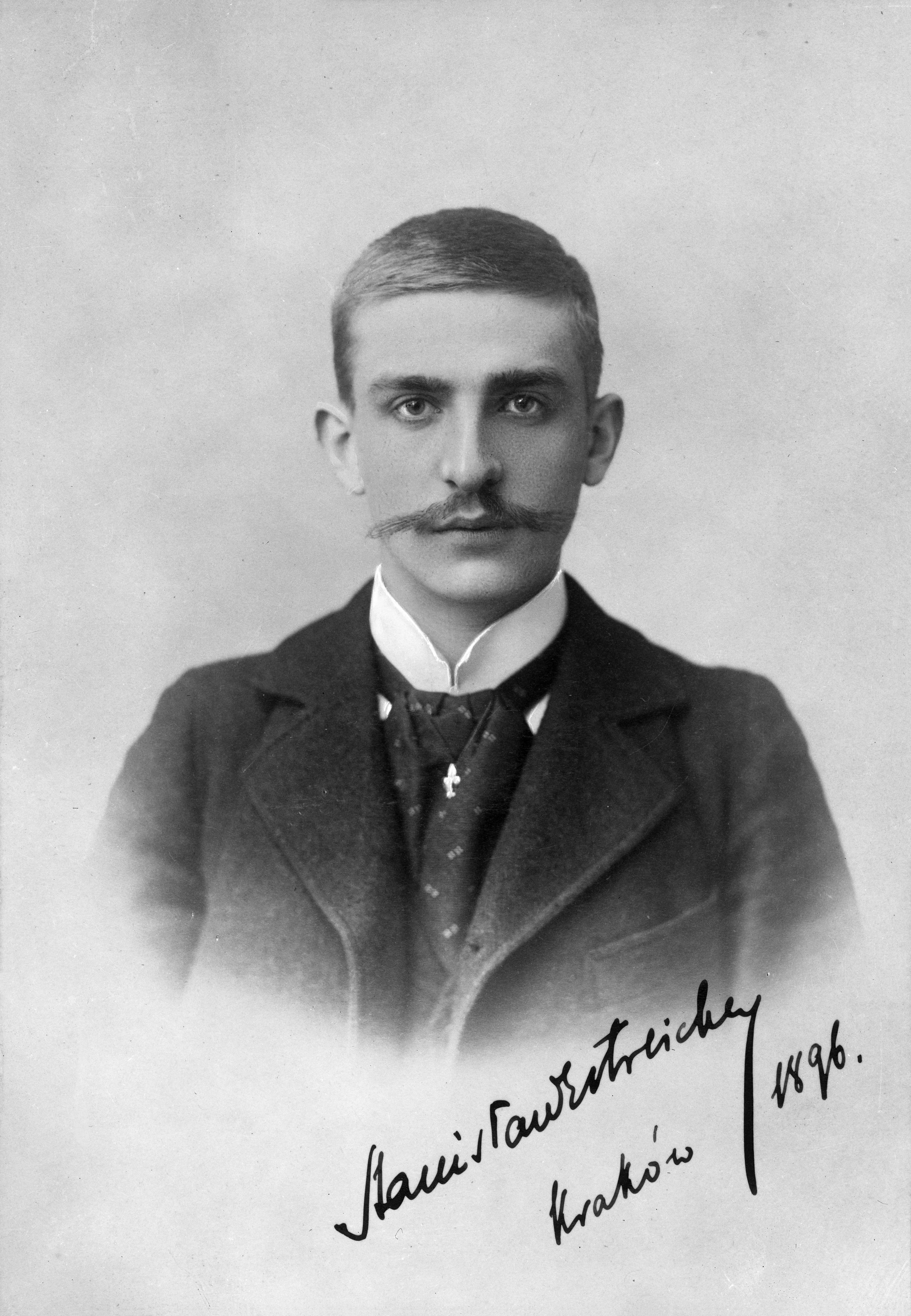
- Stanisław Estreicher, 1896
- Born: 26 November 1869; Kraków
- Died: 28 December 1939 (aged 70); Sachsenhausen
- Occupations: Historian of law, bibliographer

Academic background
- Education: Jagiellonian University

Stanisław Ambroży Estreicher (26 November 1869 – 28 December 1939) was a Polish historian of Law and bibliographer; professor of the Jagiellonian University in 1906. Following the 1939 invasion of Poland, he was briefly offered to form a puppet quasi-government by Nazi Germany. He paid with his life for his refusal to do it.

== Life ==
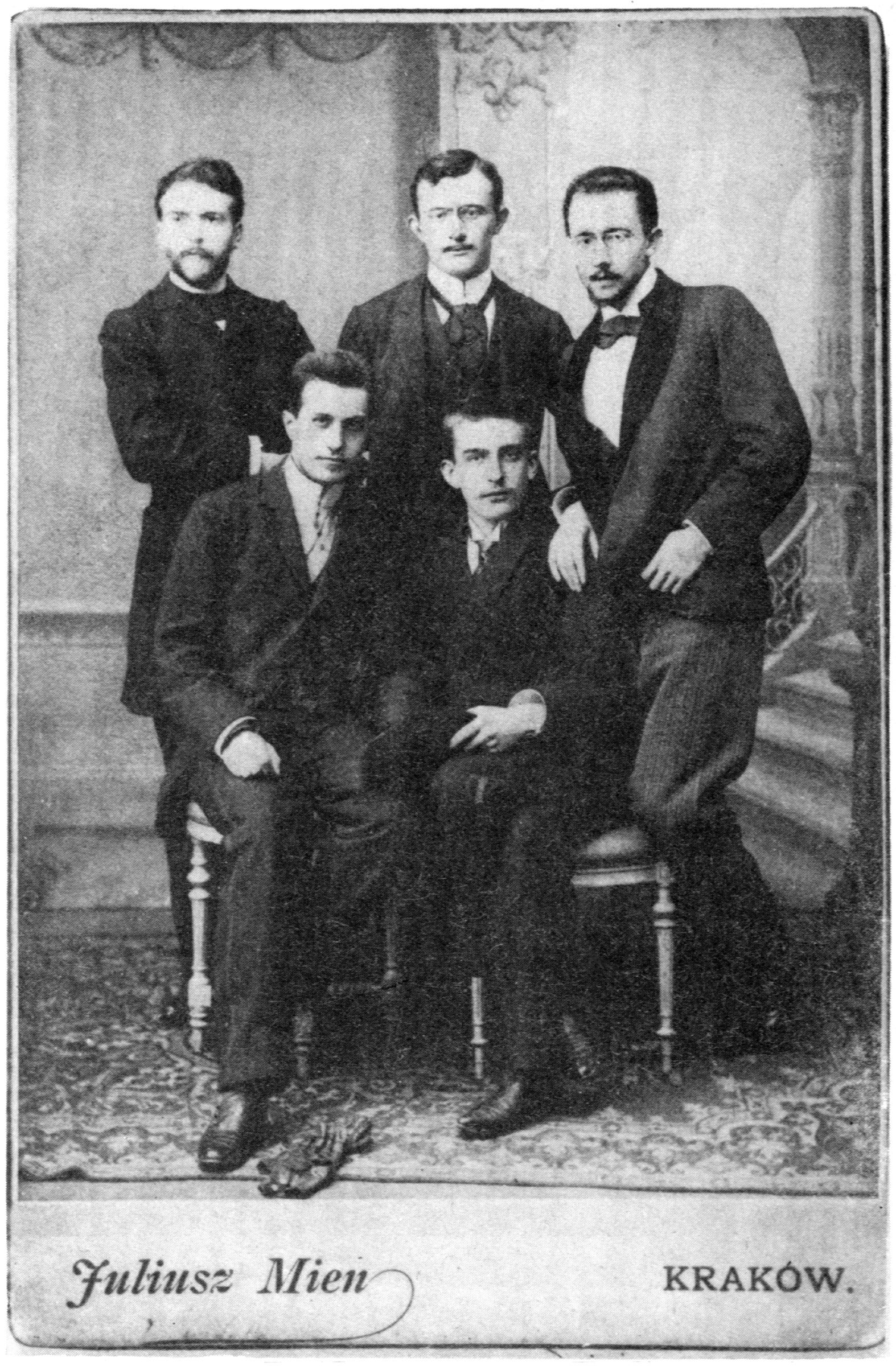
Stanisław Estreicher (sitting, right) in January 1893, with (standing, right): S. Wyspiański, L. Rydel, K. Maszkowski, and sitting (left): H.Opieński.

Stanisław Estreicher grew up in the intellectual atmosphere of an influential professorial dynasty at the Jagiellonian University. His father, Karol Józef Teofil Estreicher, was a leading historian of literature and the university's head librarian. His brother Tadeusz was a chemist and pioneer in cryogenics. His sister Maria was one of the first women in Poland to earn a doctorate (in English philology). Stanisław Estreicher’s son, Karol Estreicher, Jr., was one of the most important historians at the university and founder of the Jagiellonian University Museum. His daughter, Krystyna Grzybowska, was a children's book writer and historian.

After studying at Kraków and Vienna, Estreicher earned his “habilitation” in 1894 and became a professor at the Jagiellonian University in 1906. Among his circle of associates was a young doctoral candidate, Bronisław Malinowski. In 1911, 1918 and 1926, Estreicher was the dean of the Faculty of Law. In 1919 he was elected rector of the university and served until 1921. After the death of his father Karol Józef in 1908, he attempted to complete his father’s unfinished Bibliografia Polska (begun in 1870), a massive reference work on all significant Polish authors from the 15th to the 19th century.

Estreicher was offered by the Germans to form a puppet Nazi government in Poland, but he refused. Consequently, he was arrested by the Gestapo on 6 November 1939, along with his brother Tadeusz, and sent to the Sachsenhausen concentration camp. Stanisław Estreicher died on 28 December 1939 of uremia caused by the difficult conditions in the camp. His family was not informed until 13 January 1940, and his funeral was not held until 28 July 1940.

His wife, Helena née Longchamps, died in March 1940. His son, Karol Jr., later completed the Bibliografia Polska.

== See also ==
- List of Poles

== Sources ==
- Banach, A.K., Dybiec, J. & Stopka, K. The History of the Jagiellonian University. Kraków: Jagiellonian University Press, 2000.
- Burek, Edward (ed.) “Estreicher, Stanisław” in Encyklopedia Krakowa. Kraków: PWM, 2000.
- Estreicher, Karol Jr. Dziennik wypadków (Journal of Events), Vol I: 1939-1945. Kraków: Pałac Sztuki, 2001.
