= Tadeusz Estreicher =

Polish historian and chemist

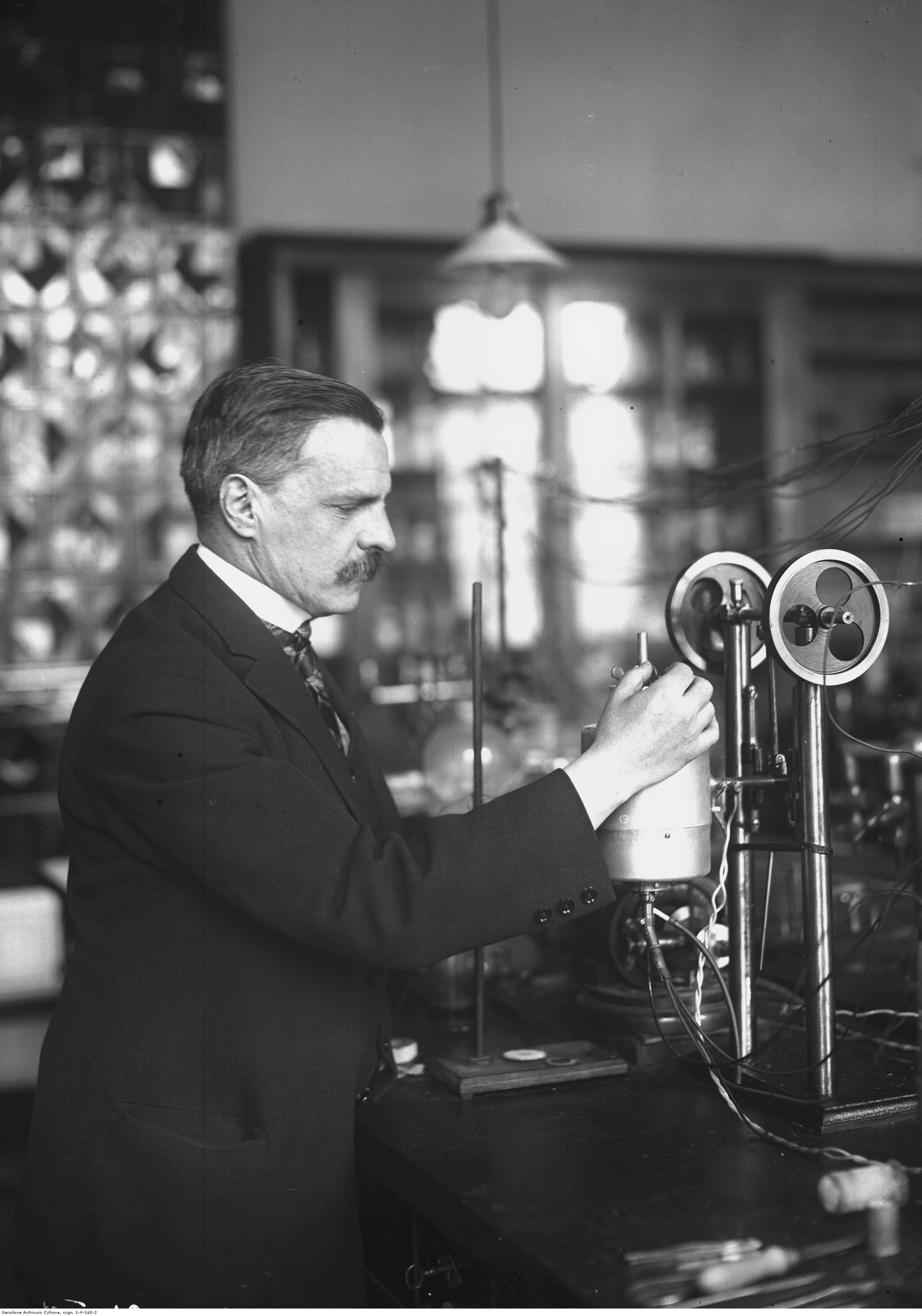
Tadeusz Estreicher

Tadeusz Kazimierz Estreicher (19 December 1871 – 8 April 1952) was a Polish chemist, historian and cryogenics pioneer.

== Life ==
Tadeusz Estreicher was born in Kraków when the city was part of the Austrian-Hungarian Empire. He grew up in the intellectual atmosphere of an influential dynasty of professors at the Jagiellonian University. His father, Karol Józef Estreicher, was a historian of literature and the chief librarian of the university. His brother, Stanisław, was a historian of law and his sister, Maria, was one of the first women in Austria-Hungary to earn a doctorate (in English philology).

Estreicher studied in Berlin, Leipzig, and in London under William Ramsay. As a student at the Jagiellonian University, Estreicher worked as an assistant to Karol Olszewski, the first chemist to liquefy oxygen. After having been appointed assistant in 1899, Estreicher successfully liquefied hydrogen in 1901 before he was promoted to Privatdozent in 1904.

In 1900, he described the Jagiellonian globe in the Transactions of the Cracow Academy of Sciences.

From 1906 until 1919 he worked in Switzerland a professor for mineral and general chemistry at the University of Fribourg where he ran a cryogenics laboratory. From 1913 to 1914 he also served as dean of the department.

In 1919, aged 47, he returned to newly independent Poland and took a position with the Jagiellonian University where he remained until his retirement. His later work examined the history and language of science.

On 6 November 1939, along with his brother Stanisław and other professors of the University, Estreicher was caught in Sonderaktion Krakau. Both were transported to the Sachsenhausen concentration camp, where his brother died on 28 December 1939. Tadeusz survived the camp and was released in February 1940, following protests from European academics to the Nazi German government.

Estreicher died in Kraków on 8 April 1952.

== See also ==
- List of Poles
