= Jagiellońska Street, Kraków =

Street in Kraków, Poland

Jagiellońska Street
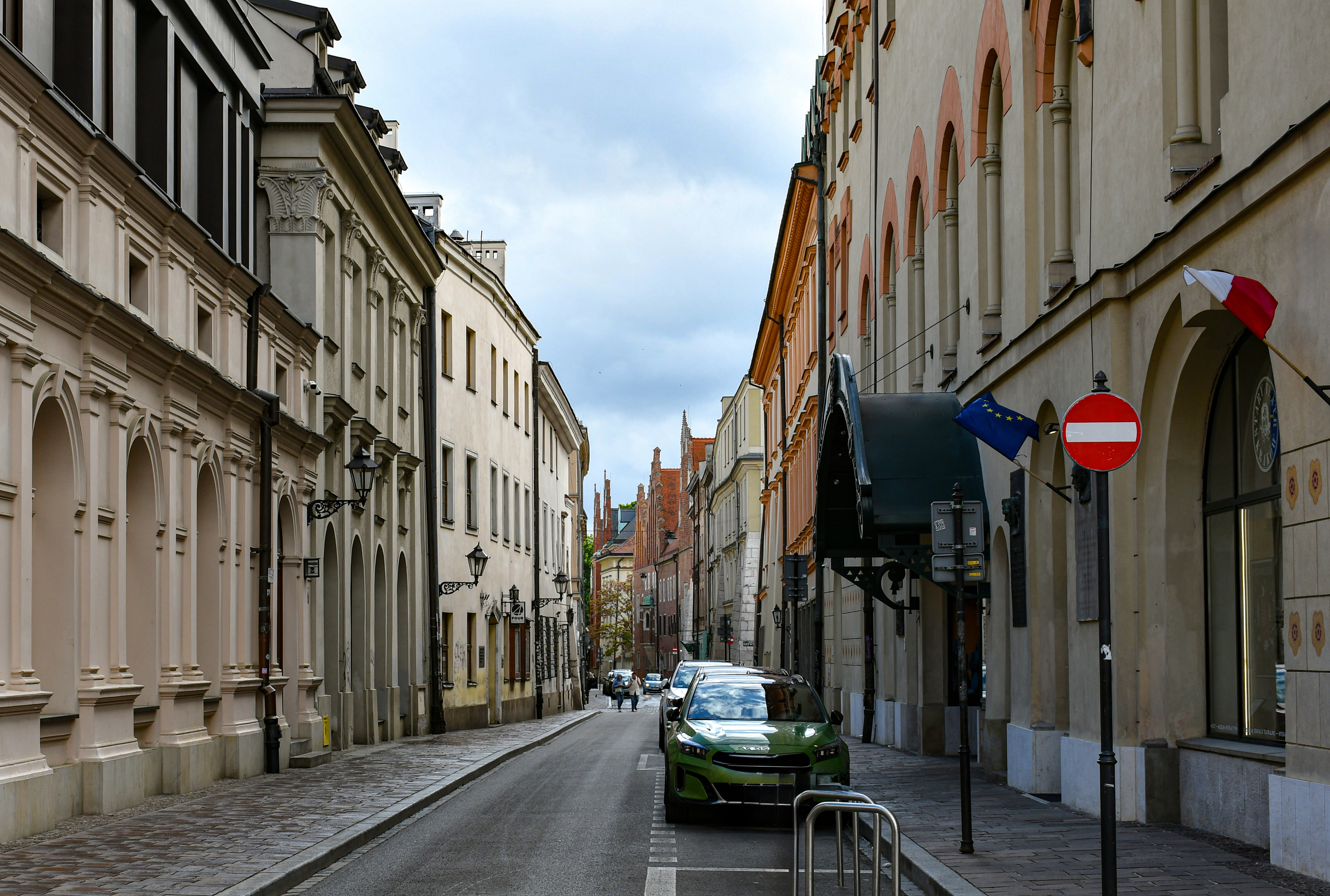
- View from Szczepański Square to the south. On the right the Old Theatre, on the left the Krzysztofory Palace and in the background the buildings of the Jagiellonian University.
- Interactive map of Jagiellońska Street
- Native name: ulica Jagiellońska (Polish)
- Length: 440 m (1,440 ft)
- North end: Szczepańska Street
- South end: Karola Olszewskiego Street

UNESCO World Heritage Site
- Type: Cultural
- Criteria: iv
- Designated: 1978
- Part of: Historic Centre of Kraków
- Reference no.: 29
- Region: Europe and North America

Historic Monument of Poland
- Designated: 1994-09-08
- Part of: Kraków historical city complex
- Reference no.: M.P. 1994 nr 50 poz. 418

Jagiellońska Street (Polish: Ulica Jagiellońska) - a historic street in the Old Town of Kraków, Poland. The street intersects the former Jagiellonian University quarter. The street features the Collegium Maius of the Jagiellonian University and the Old Theatre. Jagiellońska Street is situated to the east of Planty Park.

== Features ==
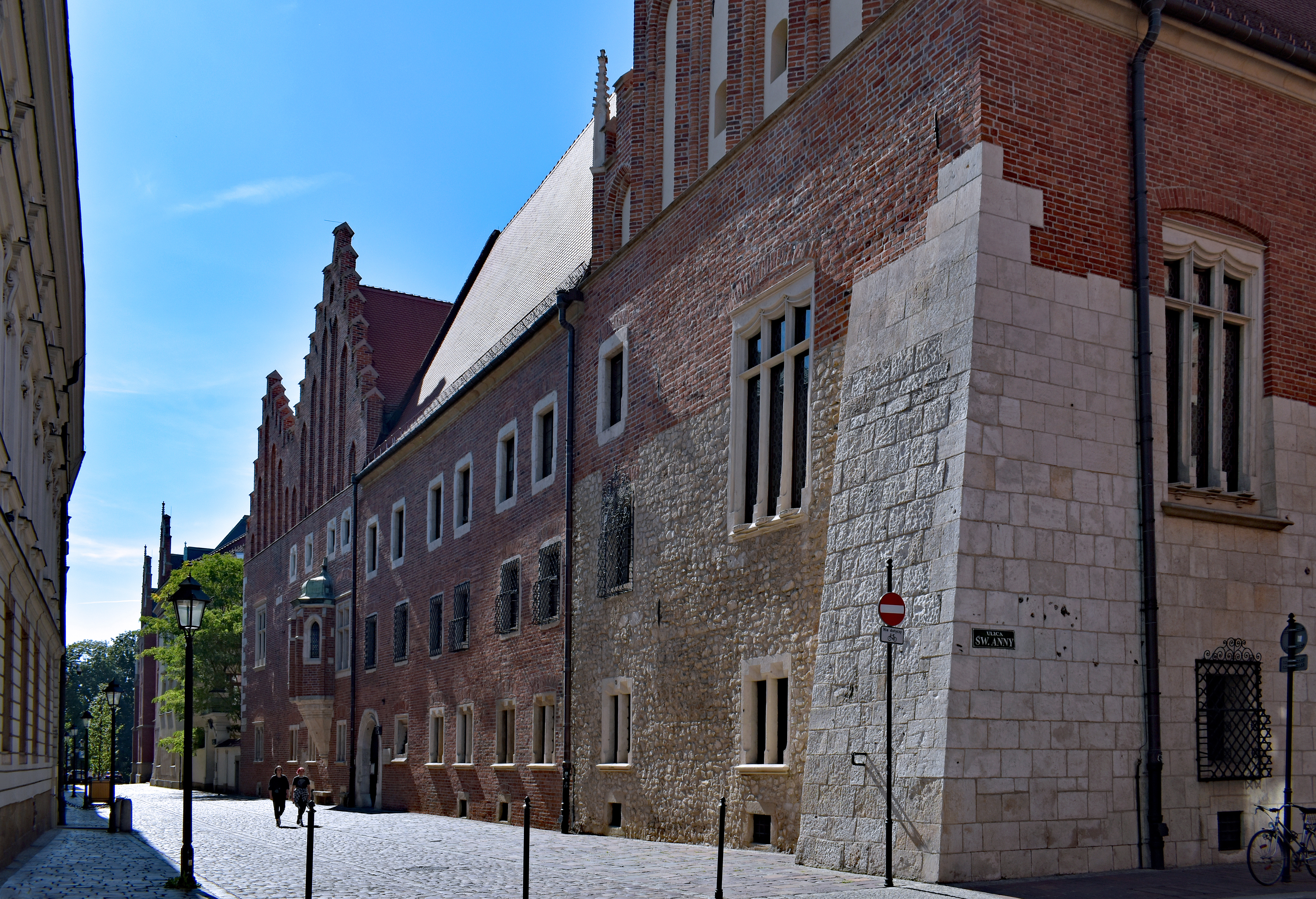
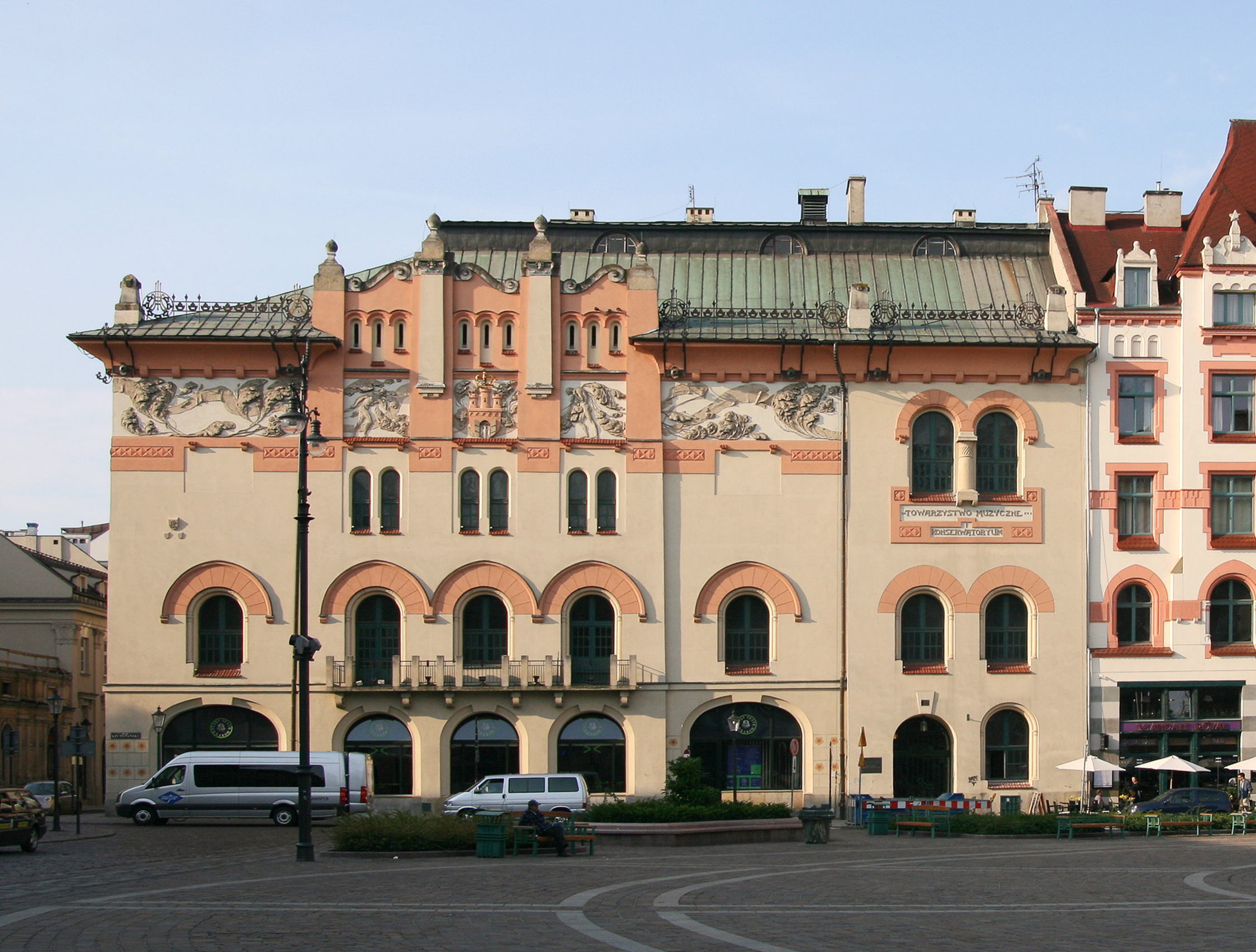
| Street No. | Short description | Picture |
|---|---|---|
| 15 | Collegium Maius of the Jagiellonian University. It is the oldest building of the university, dating back from the fourteenth-century. |
| 5 | Old Theatre - built in 1781, it is one of the oldest theatres in Poland. |
