= Karol Estreicher (senior) =

Polish bibliographer

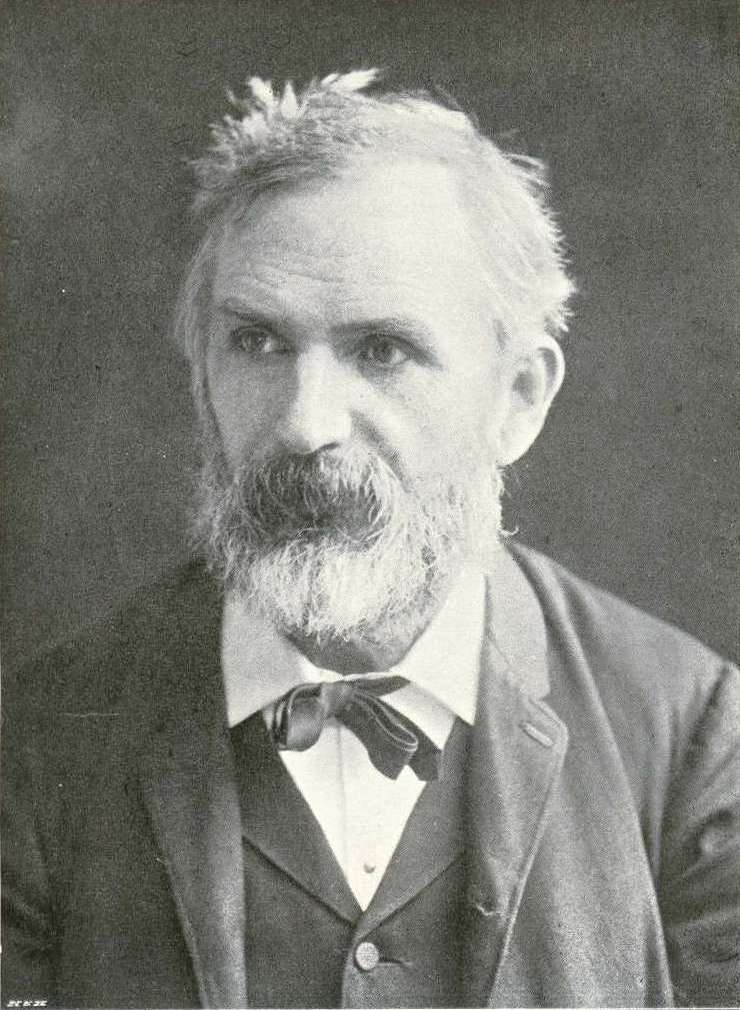
- Karol Estreicher c. 1904
- Born: 22 November 1827; Free City of Cracow
- Died: 30 September 1908 (aged 80); Kraków, Austria-Hungary
- Occupations: Bibliographer, librarian
- Children: Stanisław Estreicher, Tadeusz Estreicher, Maria Estreicherówna

Karol Józef Teofil Estreicher (22 November 1827 in Kraków – 30 September 1908 in Kraków) was a Polish bibliographer and librarian who was a founder of the Polish Academy of Learning. While he is known as the "father of Polish bibliography", he is also considered the founder of the bibliographical method in literary research. His "monumental work", Bibliografia Polska is called the "most outstanding bibliography of Polish books, and probably one of the most famous bibliographies in the world".

Estreicher was the son of Alojzy Rafał Estreicher, a natural history professor at the Jagiellonian University. After completing university studies in philosophy and law, he worked in the judiciary in Kraków and Lviv, where bibliography became his passion. Margrave Aleksander Wielopolski appointed him in 1862 as under-librarian and assistant professor of Bibliography at the Szkoła Główna Warszawska where he presented Bibliography for the first time as a standalone discipline. In 1868 he returned to Kraków and became director of the Jagiellonian Library where during a 37-year tenure he modernized and tripled its collection.

He was also an author, historian, literary critic, journalist, and theater critic.

== Works or publications ==
- "Bibliografia polska. Wyd. Tow. Naukowego Krakowskiego". Bibliografia Polska: Wydanie Towarzystwa Naukowego Krakowskieg (in Polish). Kraków: Drukarnia Uniwersytetu Jagiellońskiego. 1870. OCLC 577286474.
- Bibliografia Polska XIX stulecia: lata 1881–1900. Bibliografia polska 19. Stulecia (in Polish). Kraków: Nakładem Spółki Księgarzy Polskich. 1906–1916. OCLC 609911661 http://catalog.hathitrust.org/Record/001763723.
