= Karol Estreicher (junior) =

Polish historian

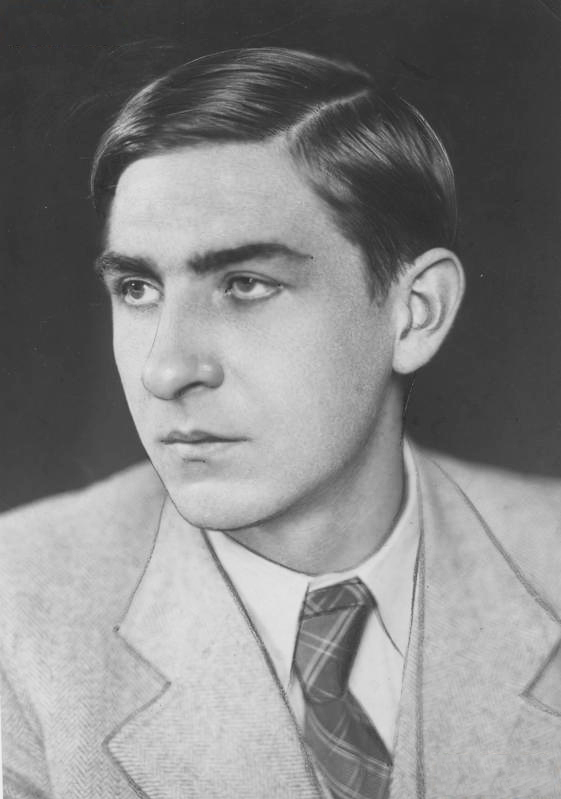
- Born: 4 March 1906; Kraków, Grand Duchy of Kraków, Austria-Hungary
- Died: 29 April 1984 (aged 78); Kraków, Polish People's Republic

Karol Estreicher (4 March 1906 in Kraków – 29 April 1984 in Kraków) was a Polish historian of art, writer and bibliographer, recipient of the Order of Polonia Restituta, son of Stanisław Estreicher.

He was a professor at Jagiellonian University and served as the head of the university's museum. He was engaged in the restitution of Polish works of art looted during World War II. In 1944, after nearly three years of intensive research, Estreicher published Poland's Cultural Losses: An Index of Polish Cultural Losses During the German Occupation, 1939–1944, which provided the basis for detailed restitution efforts in Poland at the end of the war.
