= Jerzy Vetulani =

Polish pharmacologist, neuroscientist, and biochemist (1936–2017)

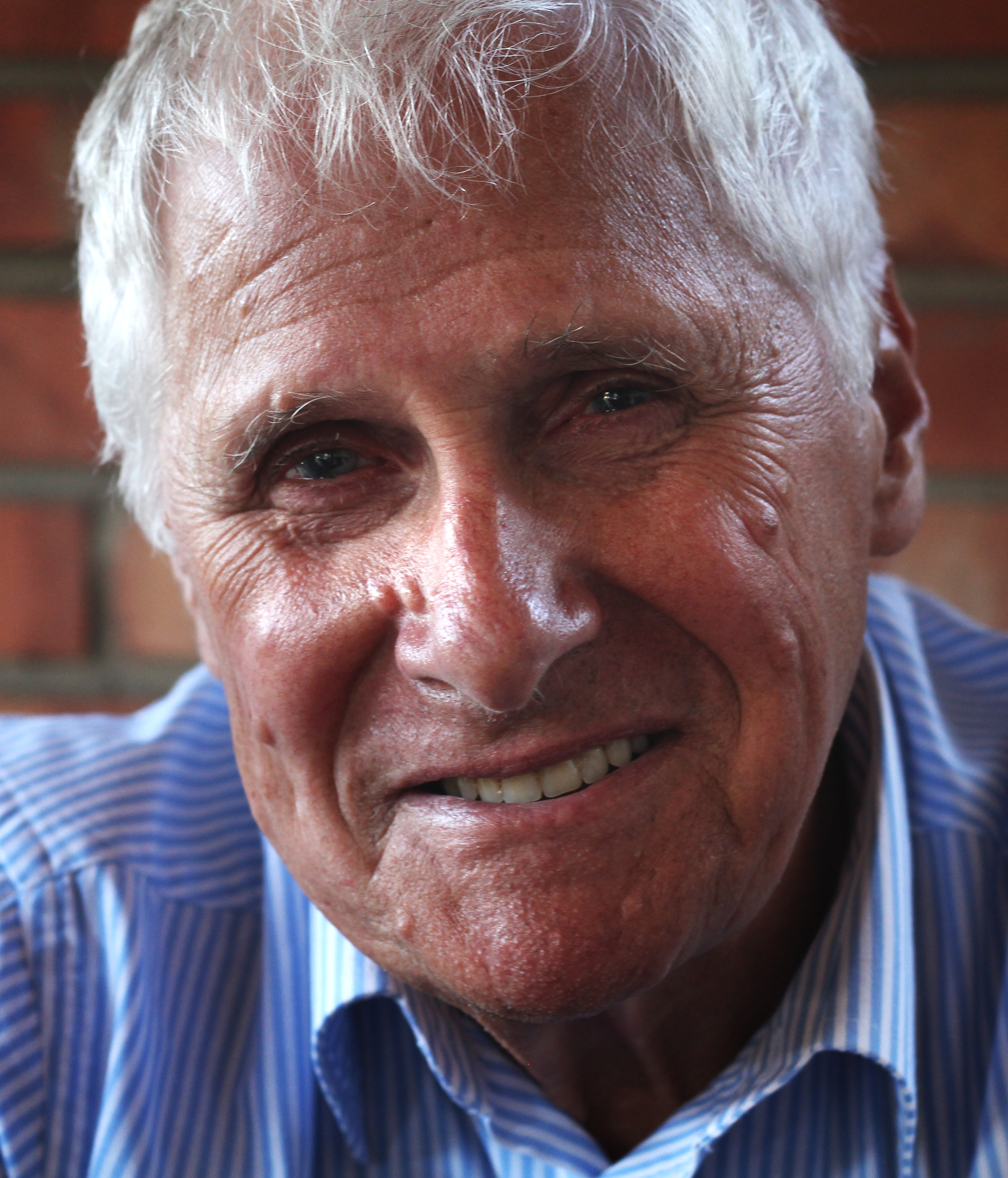
- Jerzy Vetulani, 2013
- Born: Jerzy Adam Vetulani; 21 January 1936; Kraków, Poland
- Died: 6 April 2017 (aged 81); Kraków, Poland
- Resting place: Rakowicki Cemetery
- Citizenship: Polish
- Education: Jagiellonian University
- Occupations: neuroscientist, pharmacologist, biochemist
- Employer: Institute of Pharmacology of the Polish Academy of Sciences
- Spouse(s): Maria née Pająk (m. 1963–2017, his death)
- Children: Marek Vetulani; Tomasz Vetulani
- Parent(s): Adam Vetulani; Irena née Latinik
- Relatives: Kristine Vetulani-Belfoure; Zygmunt Vetulani; Andrzej Popiel
- Awards: Anna-Monika Prize (1983)

Jerzy Adam Gracjan Vetulani (Polish pronunciation: [ˈjɛ.ʐɨ ˈa.dam ˈɡrat͡s.jan ˌvɛ.tu.ˈla.ɲi]; 21 January 1936 – 6 April 2017) was a Polish neuroscientist, psychopharmacologist and biochemist, professor of natural sciences, member of the Polish Academy of Sciences and the Polish Academy of Learning, between 1956 and 2017 employee at the Institute of Pharmacology of the Polish Academy of Sciences in Kraków, where he was head of the Department of Biochemistry (1976–2006), deputy director for Science Affairs (1994–2002) and vice chairman of the Scientific Council (2003–2017). He published more than 240 original research papers in peer-review journals. While a Research Associate Professor at the Vanderbilt University, together with Fridolin Sulser in 1975 he formulated an early hypothesis of the mechanism of action of antidepressant drugs, suggesting that downregulation of beta-adrenergic receptors is responsible for their effects. In 1983, he received Anna-Monika Prize for research on the mechanisms of the electroconvulsive therapy. Beside depression, his research interests included memory, addiction and neurodegeneration. According to Andrzej Pilc, he was one of the most frequently cited Polish scientists in the field of biomedicine between 1965 and 2001.

He was a popularizer and communicator of science, between 1981 and 2002 the editor-in-chief of the Wszechświat magazine. He ran popular lectures and authored several popular science books. Since 2010 he ran a blog Piękno neurobiologii (The Beauty of Neuroscience) and social media channels.

In the Polish People's Republic, he was an activist of the Union of Polish Youth, announcer at Piwnica pod Baranami cabaret (1954–1961) and a member of the Association of Atheists and Freethinkers. In 1978 he was registered as an unofficial collaborator of the Security Service. From 1980, he was a member of the Solidarity. For about half a century he maintained an acquaintance with Karol Wojtyła, who was chosen a pope in 1978.

He argued against the war on drugs, in favor of the legalization of marijuana and wide depenalization of drugs for adult users, criticizing Poland and other countries for their drug policies, that he considered repressive. A candidate in the Kraków presidential elections in 2002, he did not succeed. Between 2010 and 2015 he performed in the Gadający Pies (The Talking Dog) live magazine.

An honorary doctor of the Medical University of Silesia and the Medical University of Łódź, honorary fellow of Indian Academy of Neurosciences and Oxford Neurological Society, he received several dozen awards, including state distinctions, among them the Knight's Cross of Polonia Restituta.

== Biography ==
=== Social background ===
Adam Vetulani, first to the left, with his grandmother, mother and siblings, c. 1910

His father, Adam Vetulani, came from Sanok, and was a professor at the Jagiellonian University, head of the Department of Canon Law; the son of Roman Vetulani and Elżbieta née Kunachowicz (who came from an impoverished landowning family). He had daughter Kristine (born 1924), Jerzy's older sister. Jerzy Vetulani's mother, Irena Vetulani née Latinik, was a biologist and researcher at the Department of Comparative Anatomy at the Jagiellonian University, daughter of Franciszek Latinik, Polish Army General; and Helena née Stiasny-Strzelbicka. Jerzy Vetulani's uncles were: Kazimierz, Zygmunt and Tadeusz Vetulani, his closest aunt was Maria Vetulani (“Maryla”; 1895–1945), a bank clerk; his further aunts were Zofia, Maria and Cecylia Vetulani; his paternal cousins were Witold de Nisau, Wanda and Zygmunt Vetulani, and his maternal cousins were Irena and Andrzej Popiel, and Janusz and Jerzy Rieger.

=== 1936–1952: Early years and rebellion ===
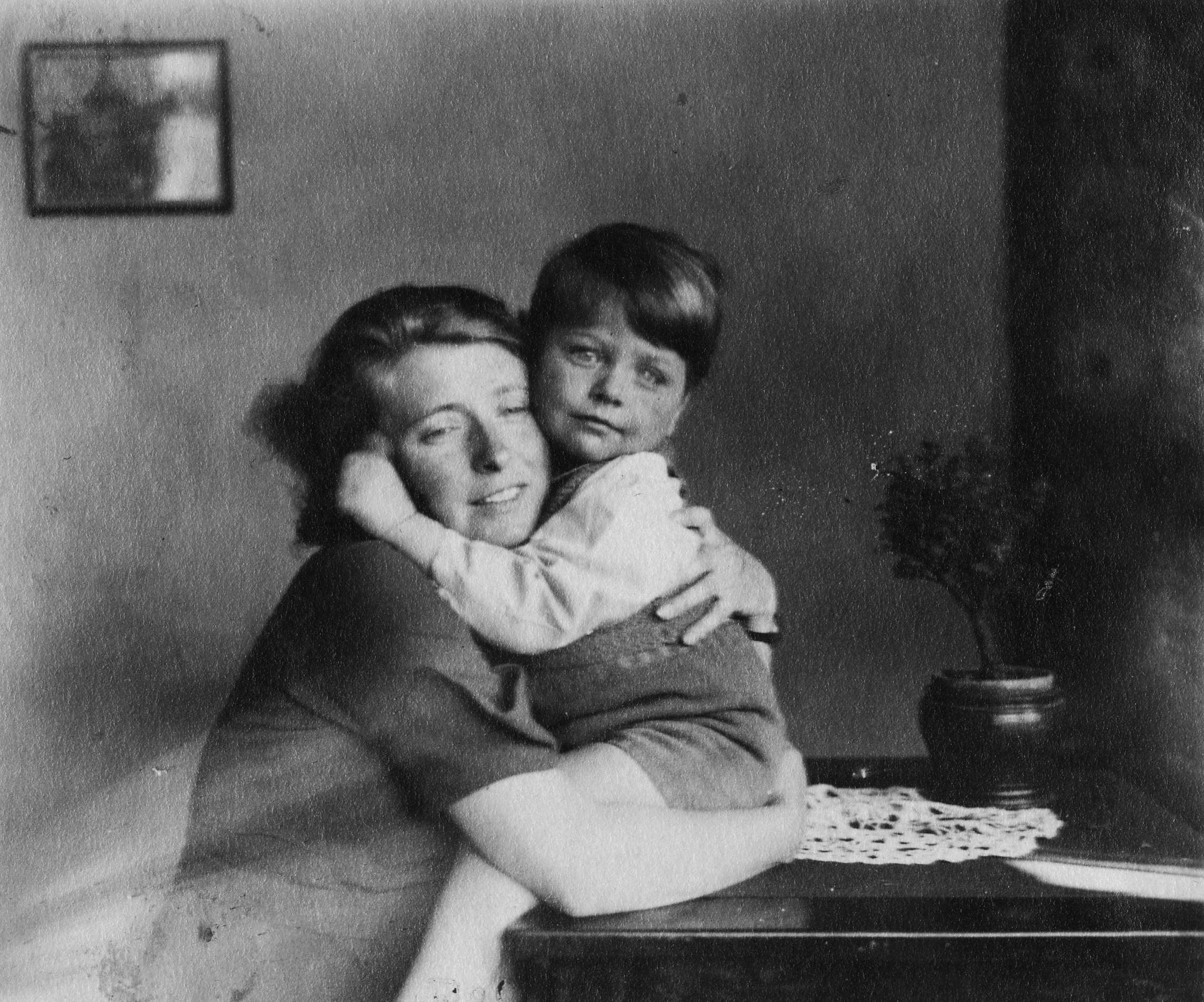
Jerzy Vetulani with his mother Irena Latinik-Vetulani, 1938

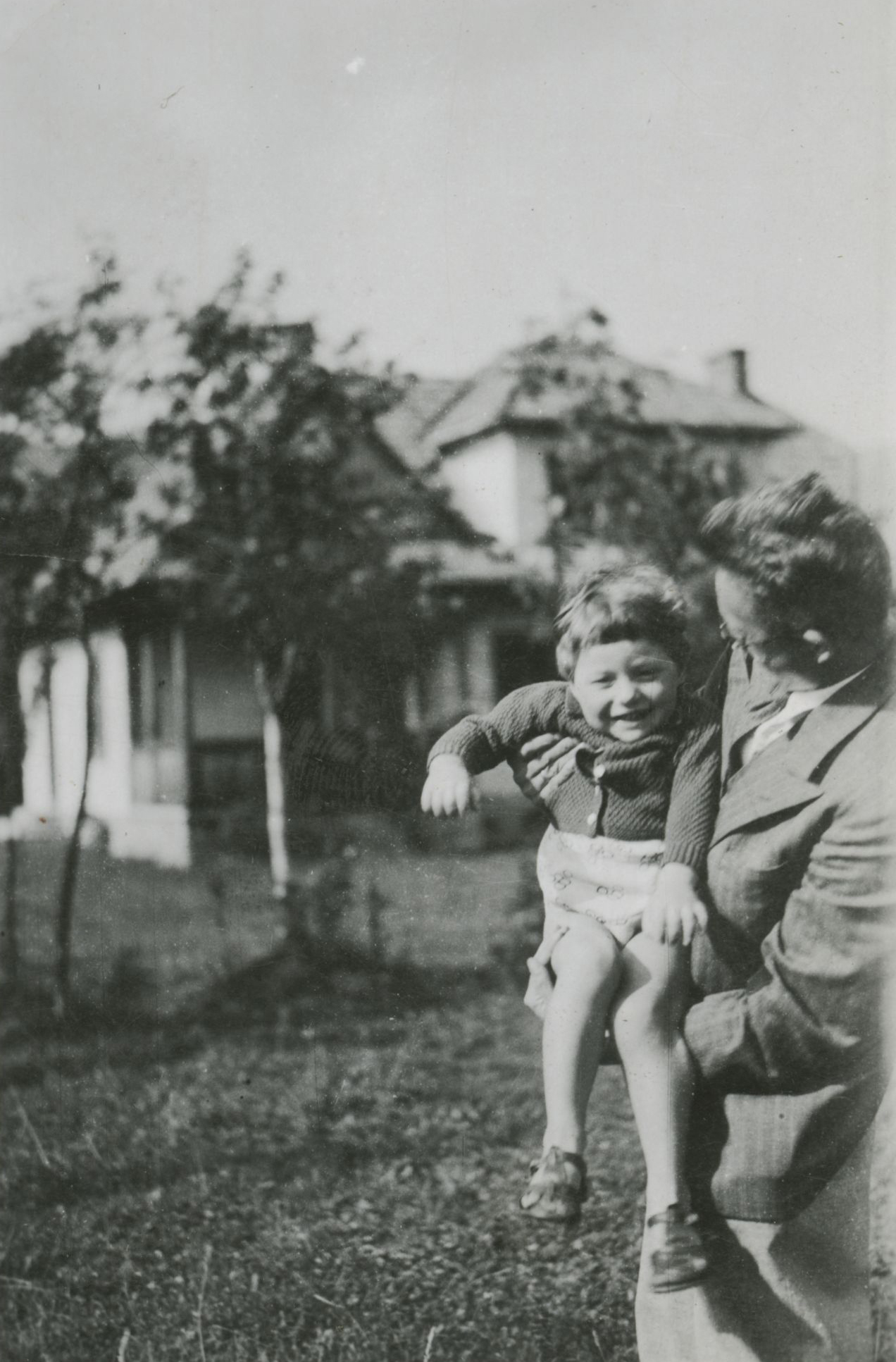
Jerzy Vetulani with his father Adam Vetulani, c. 1939

He was born on 21 January 1936 at the private gynecological hospital at Garncarska Street in Kraków, Poland. In 1938 his younger brother Jan was born. The family lived in an apartment on the ground floor of the house of professors of the Jagiellonian University at Plac Inwalidów, employing a maid, cook and Olga Rutter, a child educator.

As Nazi Germany invaded Poland in September 1939, Adam Vetulani took part in the defense war. With his unit, he went to Romania and then to France, where he also fought on the front. Eventually he was interned in Switzerland, where he spent the rest of the war organizing school camps for Polish soldiers. The correspondence sent to the occupied Poland was signed by the Fraulein Kupfer alias.

After the German army entered Kraków, Irena Vetulani and her sons had to leave the apartment. They were given forty-eight hours to move, with the possibility of keeping movable property. They moved to the premises at Garncarska Street 4, where Józefa Onitsch, the wife of General Zygmunt Zieliński, gave them refuge. The family was supported by Adam Vetulani's brother, Tadeusz, who has been living in Kraków during the war. Irena Latinik-Vetulani, thanks to her good knowledge of German, took up a job as a translator in the spirit monopoly. Jerzy and Jan Vetulani remained in war years under the care of their mother who raised both sons “in a patriotic sense of honor”. Every Sunday at home there was a “mystery” and the family used to sing Polish Catholic patriotic song Boże, coś Polskę. In his childhood, Jerzy Vetulani was a religious boy; he served as an altar boy at St. Mary's Basilica.

Jerzy Vetulani recalled the war years as interesting, full of fascinating activity and exploring the surrounding world, undermining the collective, martyrological picture of despair and misery. Together with his younger brother Jan and their friend from the tenement house, Andrzej Mirocki, they founded an insect gatherer club. They gathered a diverse collection of butterflies. Irena Latinik-Vetulani never allowed her children witness a street execution.

Jerzy Vetulani began his education in 1942 and immediately entered the second class of secret sets led by Mrs. Iwiczowa, as he was already able to read and write. From 1948 he attended the Henryk Sienkiewicz High School in Kraków, and then, after his liquidation, Bartłomiej Nowodworski High School, where he passed matura in 1952, obtaining a certificate with a distinction for best pupils.

Already as a teenager, Jerzy Vetulani has completely walked away from religion. He described himself from a young age as “a rebel who did a lot of things in spite of his parents.” At the age of twelve he enrolled in the Union of Polish Youth. He was removed from the organization as a result of a typo in the school newspaper article. In the text he mistakenly and unconsciously, instead of “the basis of socialism” (podstawy socjalizmu), he wrote “the washers of socialism” (podsrawy socjalizmu). Later he joined the Association of Atheists and Freethinkers. He belonged to the Revolutionary Youth Union (Poland), a formation of idealistic communists who were striving for reform of Polish communist system that they considered defective.

=== 1952–1973: Studies, cabaret, Institute of Pharmacology ===
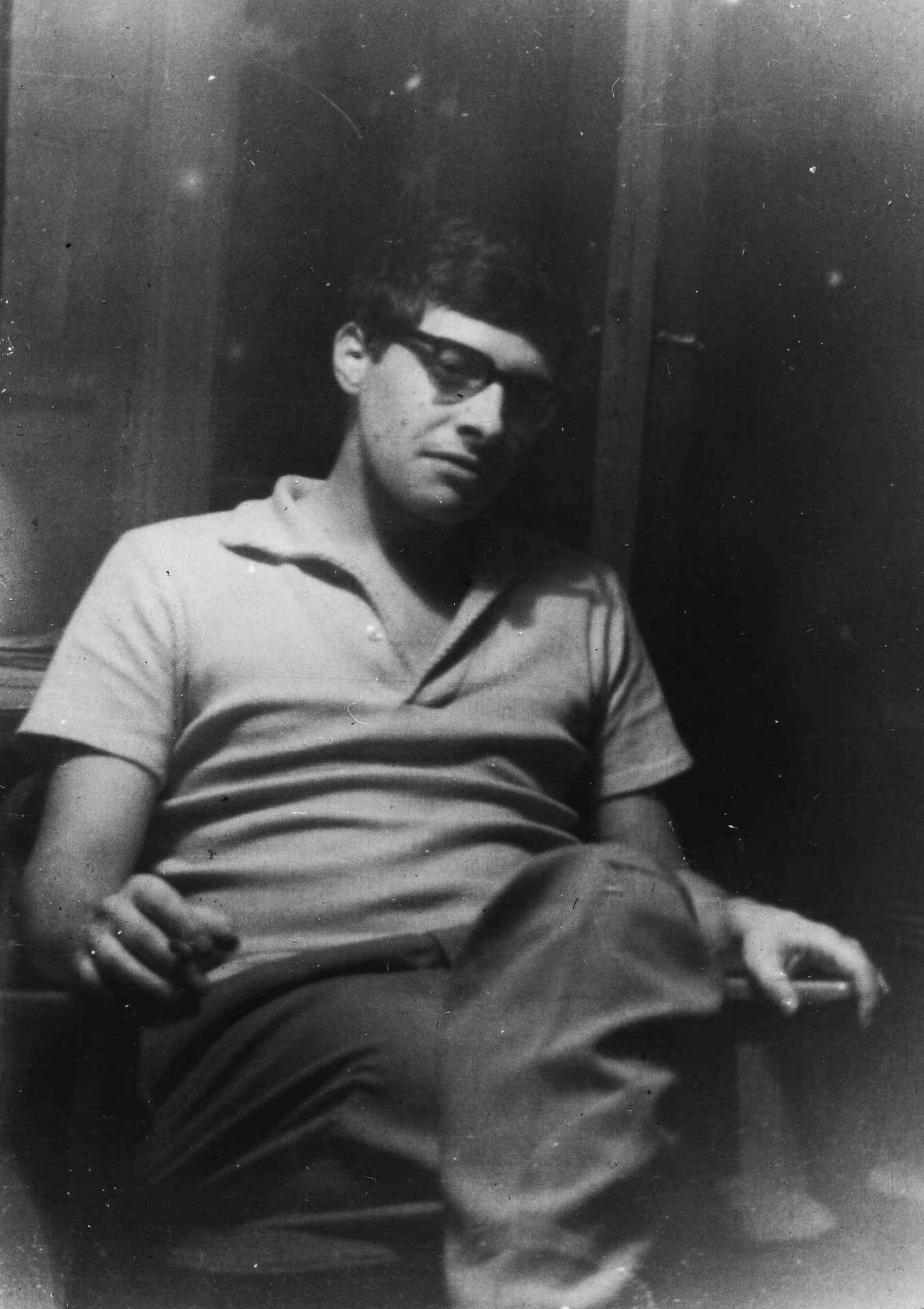
Jerzy Vetulani in the 1960s

In 1952 he began his studies in biology at the Jagiellonian University (specializing in animal physiology), which he completed in 1957, defending his thesis on the effects of ascorbic acid on rabbit blood. In March 1956, he began a volunteer internshipat at the Department of Pharmacology of the Polish Academy of Sciences (later renamed the Institute of Pharmacology), where he has been working since, until the end of his life. Janusz Supniewski was head of the department at that time. In 1957, after obtaining master's degree, Vetulani was hired as an assistant.

Later, also at the Jagiellonian University, he studied chemistry (specializing in theoretical chemistry). He graduated in 1963. As an exchange student he spent seven weeks in Swansea, where he worked at the British Iron and Steel Research Association. He rented a room at a senior Welsh marriage and studied English intensively; every day he bought an edition of Daily Mirror and underlined unknown words, that he later learned.

He was one of the founders and permanent regulars of the Piwnica pod Baranami cabaret. In the mid-1950s, together with a group of friends: Edmund Jarosz, Bronisław Chromy and Lala Skąpska, he took part in the demolition of the basement at Palace Pod Baranami, which soon became room for the cabaret. In 1958, when Piotr Skrzynecki left for Paris, Vetulani temporarily replaced him as a conference caller. It was in Piwnica that he met his future wife, Maria Pająk, whose appearance at the time he compared to Marina Vlady's. They married on 8 July 1963. Soon after that their sons Marek and Tomasz were born, respectively in 1964 and 1965. They also had four grandchildren.

I befriended all the people from Piwnica — even the charming, but unbearable Jurek Vetulani, who kept teasing me that I was old and fat, and when I entered the Piwnica, he screamed blue murder: “Turn off the light, turn off the light, the rotten wood shall shine now!”.

— Kika Szaszkiewiczowa about the friendship in Piwnica pod Baranami

In 1955–1962 he acted as a speaker at the Kraków Student Film Discussion Club. Jerzy Vetulani admitted that “it was a good thing” because “it taught him to speak short, interesting and fast”. In 1972 he was a scientific consultant for the film Illumination directed by Krzysztof Zanussi.

After the death of his brother, who drowned during a canoeing on the Dunajec River in 1965, he mobilized to begin work on his Ph.D. dissertation. He obtained Ph.D. degree in natural sciences in 1966 from Ludwik Hirszfeld Institute of Immunology and Experimental Therapy of the Polish Academy of Sciences upon dissertation The action of isoxazole and pyrazole derivatives on the metabolism of the animal system prepared under the direction of Professor Józef Hano. In the same year went to Great Britain for one year Riker scholarship. In the UK he worked on mastering spectrofluorimetric methods at the University of Cambridge under the direction of Arnold Burgen. During his stay in Cambridge, he encountered Bożena Puchalska and Juliusz Hibner.

After returning to Poland he started work in the field of psychopharmacology under the direction of Jerzy Maj.

=== 1973–1989: In the orbit of world science. Opposition ===
After submitting a habilitation dissertation, he left to the United States for almost two years. There, he worked from 1973 to 1975 as Research Associate Professor at the Vanderbilt University. He gained international recognition after the discovery in 1975, with Fridolin Sulser, of β-downregulation by chronic administration of antidepressants and the formulation of β-downregulation hypothesis as a mechanism of action of antidepressants. The work on this subject, published by Vetulani and Sulser in Nature, became citation classic, receiving 580 vocations by 2007.

After his mother's death, he and his family decided to return to Poland. Vetulani received his habilitation degree in 1976 (upon work Neuroleptics, monoamine oxidase inhibitors and dopamine beta-hydroxylase inhibitors: their actions and synergies), an associate professor in 1983, and a professor in 1989. In 1976, he was appointed Head of the Department of Biochemistry at Institute of Pharmacology.

In the 1970s he translated several short stories by Ursula le Guin for magazine Przekrój. In Przekrój he also published short articles on his stay in the United States. Back in the 1960s he was offered regular work in Przekrój by its long-time editor-in-chief Marian Eile, but refused due to lack of possibility to combine scientific career with a full-time job as a columnist in a weekly.

Since 1978 he has regularly collaborated with the Consiglio Nazionale delle Ricerche (CNR, National Research Council) in Rome. On behalf of the Institute of Pharmacology of the Polish Academy of Sciences he was a coordinator of the joint research program of his home Institute with the Istituto di Biology Cellulare and Neurobiology (IBCN). When visiting Rome, he usually received an audience with John Paul II, who was a student of his father and friend of the family. Also in 1978 he was registered as Security Service unofficial collaborator. His codename was "Laborant" and his operational number was 19856. From the 1970s he was in a close relationship with Sylwia Tomecka-Suchoń. They befriended Małgorzata and Jacek Ostaszewscy. Since the mid-1970s he suffered from glaucoma.

In 1983 Jerzy Vetulani received Anna-Monika Prize (2nd class) for his research on the mechanism of electroconvulsion. In years 1981–2002 he was the editor-in-chief of Wszechświat, one of the oldest Polish popular science magazines. He was also the editor-in-chief of the Polish Journal of Pharmacology and Pharmacy (1993–1996). He obtained the title of associate professor in 1983 and the title of full professor in 1989.

From 1980 he was an activist in the Solidarity movement. He was a member of the Solidarity Work Committee to the Department and Branches of the Polish Academy of Sciences in Kraków and was the 56th member of the Coordinating Commission for Science. In 1987–1989 he was a member of the Solidarity's Board of the Małopolska Region, at the end of that period, from 1989 to 1990 he was a member of the Presidium of the Board. He mainly dealt with programming matters and advised organization's authorities in the region. In the work for Solidarity he took advantage of the position of the editor-in-chief of a scientific magazine; during the martial law he smuggled a letter from Solidarity's region authorities from Poland to Vatican, where he passed it to pope John Paul II. He thought this smuggling was possible only because he wasn't searched, as a person at such an important position, and accompanied in his travel to Italy then by Mieczysław Czuma, editor-in-chief of Przekrój.

=== 1989–2006: Late career and social activity ===
Jerzy Vetulani was a member of Solidarity Citizens' Committee (1989–1990) and Kraków Solidarity Club (1994–1995).

Between 1992 and 1998 he was a member of the Collegium Internationale Neuro-Psychopharmacologicum. In 1999–2001 he was the President of the Polish Neuroscience Society. He also introduced Polish term for neurofibrillary tangles, which he called splątki neurofibrylarne.

In 1991 he was appointed a correspondent member of the Polish Academy of Learning. He was appointed a full member in 1996. He regularly held meetings of the Scientific Cafe at the Polish Academy of Learning at Sławkowska Street 17, as the opening and moderator of the discussions. He was a member of the board of the Kraków Society of Friends of Fine Arts (2001–2017) and a member of the chapter of the Laurel of Kraków of the 21st century (also 2001–2017). He was a member of the board of the Society for the Advancement and Promotion of Science and member of the Warsaw Scientific Society and the European Dana Alliance for the Brain (EDAB). In 2002 he was appointed vice-chairman of the Scientific Council of the Insitiute of Pharmacology of the Polish Academy of Sciences.

Over the years, his students (many of whom worked in the Department of Biochemistry he led) included Irena Nalepa (collaboration in the years 1986–2017), Piotr Popik, Lucyna Antkiewicz-Michaluk (close cooperation in the years 1976–2006), Andrzej Pilc, Krystyna Gołembiowska, Jolanta Zawilska, Marek Sanak, Rafał Ryguła and Dominika Dudek.

In 2002 he was a founding member of the Forum for Małopolska Association and ran unsuccessfully for the presidency of the city of Kraków, obtaining 2375 votes (1.19%) in the first round of elections.

In 2008 he was elected a correspondent member of the Polish Academy of Sciences. Over the years, he held various functions in the academy's structures. He was the secretary of the Committee of Physiological Sciences (1978–1981), chair of the Neurobiology Committee (2007–2011), a member of the Scientific Council of the Institute of Experimental Biology (1993–2007) and the Institute of Experimental and Clinical Medicine (2003–2007) of the Polish Academy of Sciences.

=== 2006–2017: Towards popular science ===
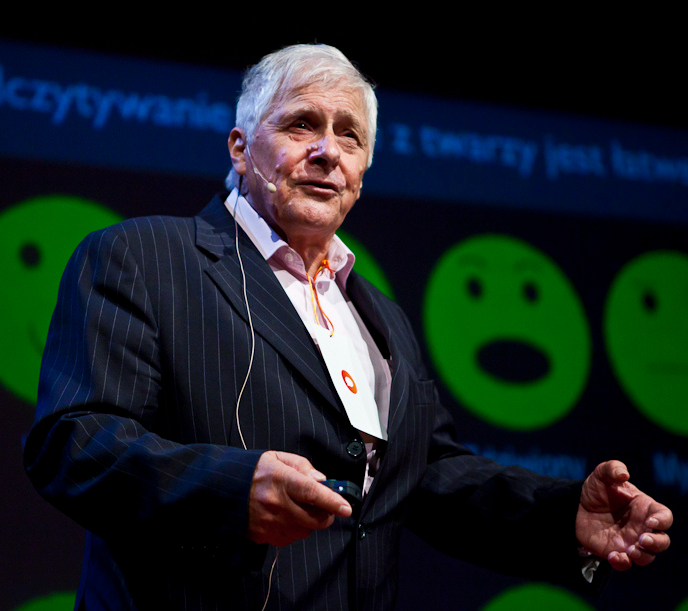
Jerzy Vetulani at TEDxKraków, 2011

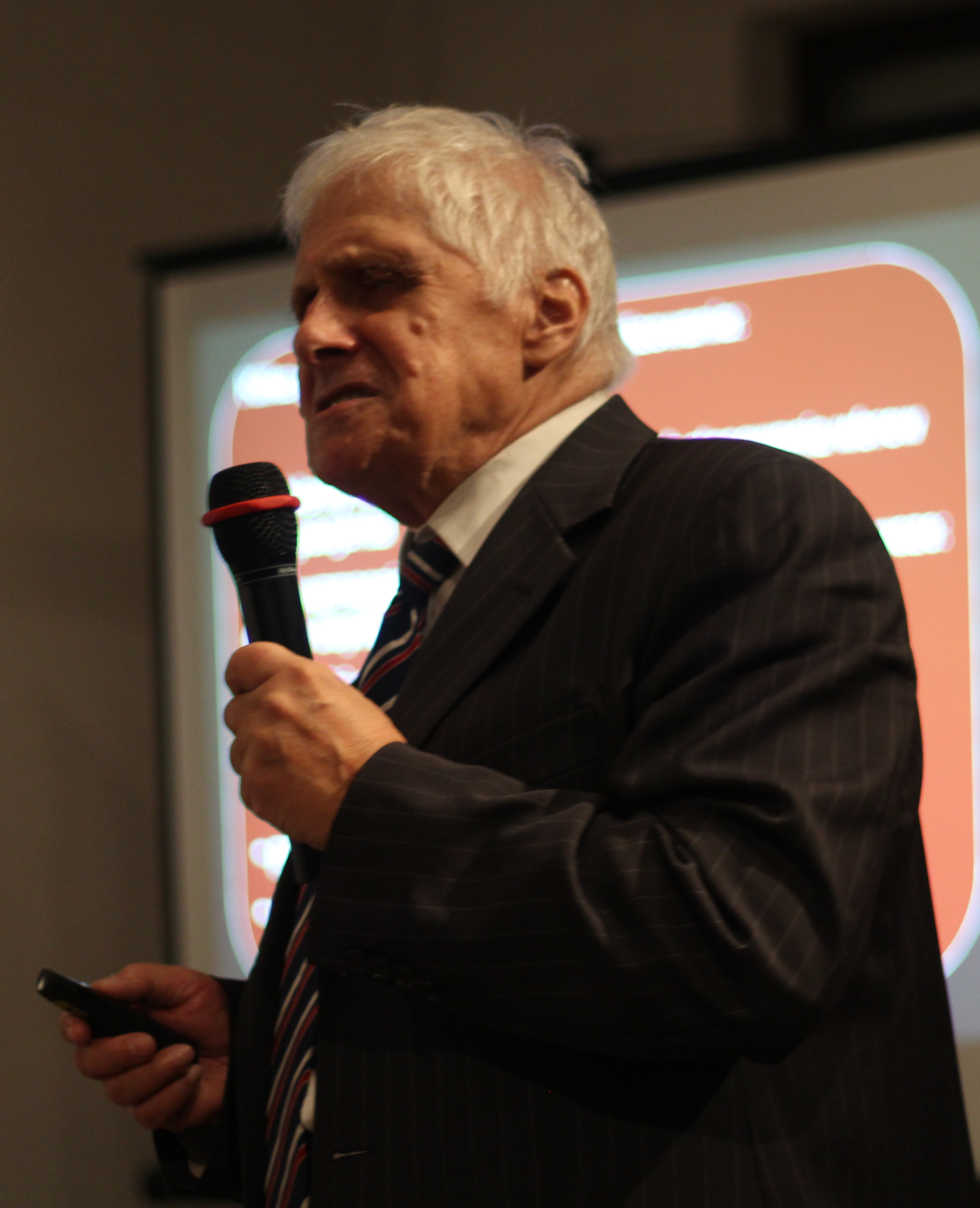
Jerzy Vetulani in Gorlice, 2013

In 2006, Vetulani left the position of head of the department of biochemistry of the Institute of Pharmacology of the Polish Academy of Sciences and devoted himself to a large degree to popular science. In this field he was active already in the 1960s when he published short texts in Wszechświat, as a rule signing articles with his own name or with pseudonym J. Latini. After 2000 he became known for his popular science lectures, which focused on themes connected with the functioning of human brain and the relationship between neuroscience and various social and cultural aspects. In 1999 he was a lecturer during the Kraków Brain Days, and since 2000 he has performed every year at the Kraków Brain Week organized as a part of World Brain Awareness Week.

Since June 2010 Vetulani ran a blog titled Piękno neurobiologii (The Beauty of Neuroscience) on WordPress. There, he published articles on discoveries in the fields of neuroscience and psychopharmacology and comments on the curiosities of the human brain and, additionally, various cultural and social matters. The direct cause of the founding of the site was the removal of Vetulani's column in Wprost magazine by the newly elected editor-in-chief Tomasz Lis. As the main motivator for blogging Vetulani has pointed the desire to share his own knowledge with others. In a 2011 interview he said, “Soon, what's in my brain will kick the bucket, so I have to try to pass on to others as much as I can.”. He chose this form of sharing his texts because of the ability to reach wide group of readers, as well as because of the independence and freedom of content and deadlines. Since December 2011, he has also run a channel on YouTube, on which has published videos and records of his lectures. Vetulani published several popular articles on the topic of neuroscience, he has often given interviews for various magazines and appeared in the radio and television, becoming, especially in the last decade of his life, a celebrity in science.

After 1989 Vetulani politically sympathized with the center and the left. He has publicly supported specific candidats for public offices. In the 2010 presidential election in both rounds he supported Bronisław Komorowski and in the parliamentary election a year later Józef Lassota. In 2014 European Parliament election he supported Jan Hartman, expressing at the same time his solidarity with Róża Thun. Prior to the first round of presidential election in 2015, he supported Janusz Palikot. In the same year, in the parliamentary election he again supperted Lassota's candidature, congratulating him after obtaining a seat in the Sejm.

In the 2000s he lectured regularly at several colleges in Kraków. He was a professor of the Małopolska Higher Vocational School of J. Dietl in Kraków, where he taught classes in cosmetology and dietetics (neurobiological aspect) and the School of Medicine in English at the Jagiellonian University Collegium Medicum. He also lectured at the Faculty of Applied Psychology at the Jagiellonian University and at the Pontifical University of John Paul II.

In 2010 he performed in a lip dub created by the community of Jagiellonian University. He appeared in its opening sequence as a grandfather of a little girl, the main character in the clip. Also from 2010 Vetulani regularly appeared on the stage of the talking magazine Gadający Pies (The Talking Dog), of which he became one of the main attractions and recognizable signs over time. One of the showrunners, Maciej Piotr Prus, described Vetulani as “the star of the first magnitude”, adding that all participants were always waiting for his speeches. Vetulani compared the atmosphere of The Talking Dog to the ambience present in the beginnings of Piwnica pod Baranami. In his short presentations, the scientist used obscene humor and vulgarity, which some considered to be a violation of good taste, but most of the audience was enthusiastic to this kind of performance. In 2013 Vetulani performed and was the executive producer of the short film Hydrophobia, a mockumentary that ridiculed social phobias and premiered also at The Talking Dog. He co-created the performance Dreams Music directed by Czet Minkus, where he performed alongside Jan Peszek and Agata Zubel; the show was presented on December 19, 2013, in the Małopolska Garden of Art (MOS). In 2010 and 2015 Vetulani performed with Leszek Długosz with a concert program Rozumie mój (Oh, My Mind), in which poetry sung by Długosz was exchanged with Vetulani's neuroscience commentary. On December 31, 2014, he was appointed a member of the Program Board of the Station in Rome of the Polish Academy of Sciences.

Since 2014, he has been supporting auctions of the Great Orchestra of Christmas Charity; he devoted for auctions signed books and the opportunity to meet him at coffee or dinner. In 2015 and 2017 he was in the Honorary Committee of the Parada Równości (Equality Parade, pride parade held in Warsaw). Following the rule of Law and Justice party in Poland he sharply criticized their reforms, expressing his support for some of the actions undertaken by the Committee for the Defence of Democracy; he participated in the protest against taking over public media by the ruling party in January 2016, saying that he “had the fantastic atmosphere of the event: in spite of the January chill – the crowds of old and young full of energy, each step you meet a friend (...). The event had both high civic and social value”, although he kept certain criticism to the form of the protest. Invited by students, he participated in the protest on the Main Market Square in Kraków in January 2017. He also supported Black Protest, what he manifested by simply wearing black clothes. In November 2016, an exhibition of photographs by Adam Golec from Vetulani's eightieth birthday party, that Vetulani organized in his home hosting at once around one hundred and eighty people, was opened at the Galeria Olympia. During the party, Golec portrayed the participants in a specially prepared mini-studio, on the background painted by Iwona Siwek-Front.

=== Accident and death ===
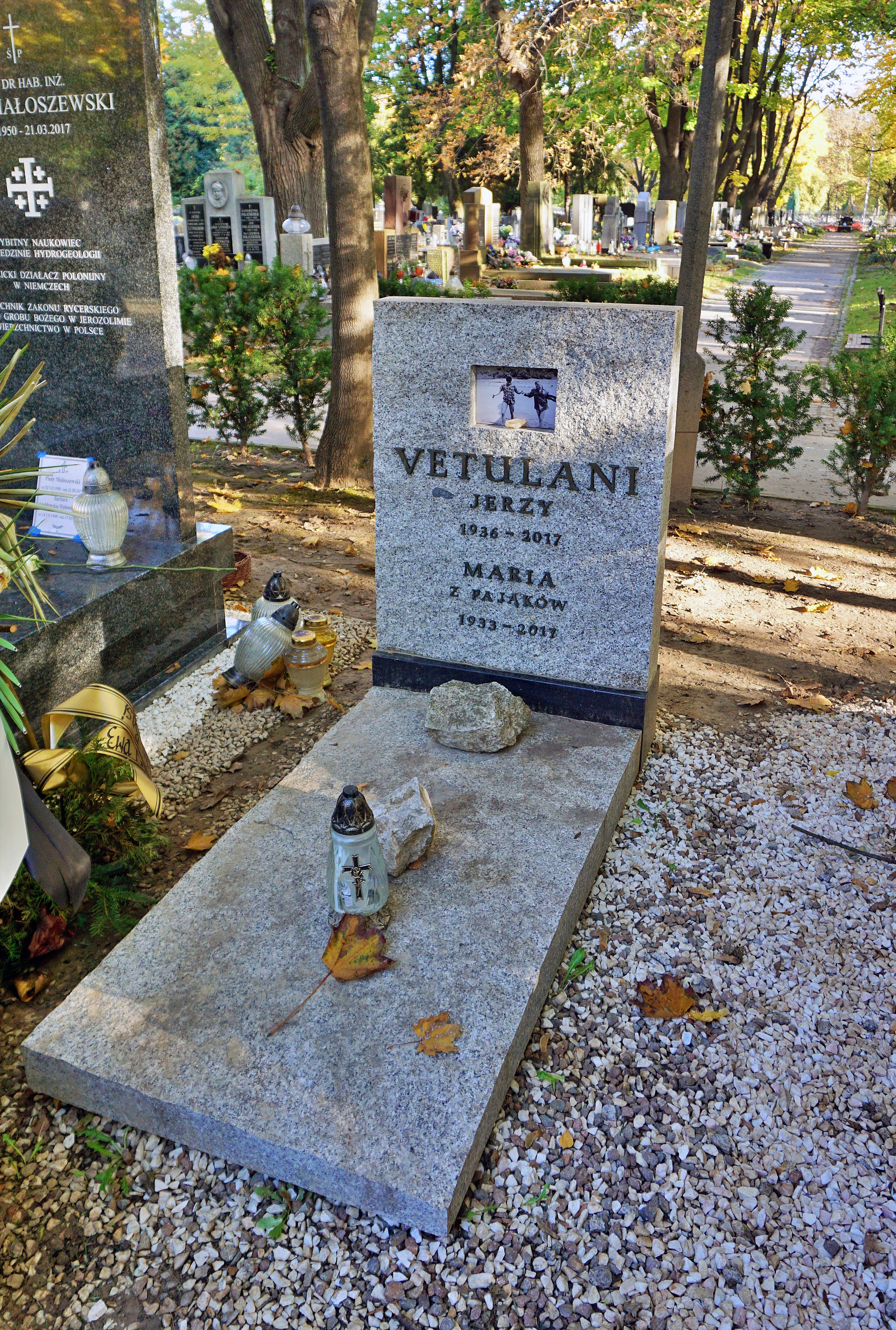
The grave of Jerzy and Maria Vetulani at the Rakowicki Cemetery in Kraków

On March 2, 2017, in the evening, Vetulani, who was at the age of 81, was hit by an automobile at the pedestrian crossing receiving serious injuries. Vetulani was walking home from his regular place of work, the Institute of Pharmacology of the Polish Academy of Sciences, taking a route he knew very well. Directly after the accident he was put into a pharmacological coma, and his condition was determined as severe but stable. He was being treated at the Emergency Medicine Rescue and Disaster Center at the Szpital Uniwersytecki (University Hospital) in Kraków, under the supervision of the team of Professor Jerzy Wordliczek.

Vetulani's health did not improve and he died in the hospital on April 6, 2017. He was buried on April 18, 2017, in the Avenue of the Meritorious at the Rakowicki Cemetery in Kraków. Aleksander Janicki, visual artist and Vetulani's friend was the master of the ceremony which was carried out in a secular rite. Among the speakers at the funeral were Mayor of Kraków Jacek Majchrowski, president of the Polish Academy of Learning Andrzej Białas, Member of the Sejm Józef Lassota, and also friends and family of Jerzy Vetulani.

His wife Maria Vetulani died on 21 September 2017.

== Views ==
As crucial in shaping his worldview, Jerzy Vetulani pointed The Naked Ape by English zoologist Desmond Morris. He first came across Morris's work in Cambridge in 1967 and said: “Thanks to this book for the first time I saw that you could approach a man like a normal animal species. (...) I realized at that time how ridiculous is a man who, as an animal instead of on all fours, is walking on two legs. How funny we look, hairless almost all over the body. (...) I also got rid of the belief in the superuniqueness of Homo sapiens”. Vetulani defined the source of happiness and fulfillment of life, considered from the perspective of biology, as the immortalization of one's own genes by passing them on to the next generations. He often referred to Theodosius Dobzhansky's well-known quotation and the title of one of Dobzhansky's works: Nothing in Biology Makes Sense Except in the Light of Evolution. Vetulani was close to the philosophy of utilitarianism of John Stuart Mill; he said: “Moral is what serves to increase the happiness of mankind. There is only one problem – unfortunately we have no way of summing up that happiness”. He was a fan of fantasy and science fiction literature, and especially of authors such as Ursula K. Le Guin, Isaac Asimov, J. R. R. Tolkien and George R. R. Martin. As his motto he adopted a phrase from Asimov's Foundation: “May your moral sense never lead you to make a wrong decision”.

== Selected works ==
=== Original research papers ===
- Vetulani J, Sulser F (1975). "Action of various antidepressant treatments reduces reactivity of noradrenergic cyclic AMP-generating system in limbic forebrain". Nature. 257 (5526) (5526 ed.): 495–6. Bibcode:1975Natur.257..495V. doi:10.1038/257495a0. PMID 170534. S2CID 4185467.
- Vetulani J, Bednarczyk B (1977). "Depression by clonidine of shaking behaviour elicited by nalorphine in morphine-dependent rats". Journal of Pharmacy and Pharmacology. 29 (9) (1 ed.): 567–9. doi:10.1111/j.2042-7158.1977.tb11401.x. PMID 21267. S2CID 37647001.
- Nalepa I, Vetulani J (1991). "Involvement of Protein Kinase C in the Mechanism of in Vitro Effects of Imipramine on Generation of Second Messengers by Noradrenaline in Cerebral Cortical Slices of the Rat Neuroscience". Neuroscience. 44 (3) (3 ed.): 585–90. doi:10.1016/0306-4522(91)90079-4. PMID 1661384. S2CID 38713065.
- Vetulani J, Antkiewicz-Michaluk L, Nalepa I, Sansone M (2003). "A Possible Physiological Role for Cerebral Tetrahydroisoquinolines". Neurotoxicity Research. 5 (1–2) (1 ed.): 147–155. doi:10.1007/BF03033379. PMID 12832229. S2CID 25130188.
- Antkiewicz-Michaluk L, Lazarewicz JW, Patsenka A, Kajta M, Zieminska E, Salinska E, Wasik A, Golembiowska K, Vetulani J (2006). "The Mechanism of 1,2,3,4-Tetrahydroisoquinolines Neuroprotection: the Importance of Free Radicals Scavenging Properties and Inhibition of Glutamate-Induced Excitotoxicity". Journal of Neurochemistry. 97 (3) (3 ed.): 846–856. doi:10.1111/j.1471-4159.2006.03756.x. PMID 16515537. S2CID 22056555.

=== Monographs and booklets ===
- 1964: Półprzewodniki organiczne (“Organic Semiconductors”, co-authors: Krzysztof Pigoń, Kazimierz Gumiński, published by Wydawnictwa Naukowo-Techniczne)
- 1996: Teoria a praktyka leczenia depresji (“Theory and Practice of Depression Treatment”, editor, published by Jagiellonian University Collegium Medicum)
- 2006: Narkotyki bez dydaktyki (“Drugs Without the Lecture”, free supplement to the weekly Polityka)
- 2012: Farmakoterapia depresji – współczesne podstawy teoretyczne i doświadczenia kliniczne (“Pharmacotherapy of Depression – Contemporary Theoretical Foundations and Clinical Experience”, editor, with Janusz Heitzman, published by Termedia)

=== Popular science books ===
- 1985: Dzień dzisiejszy i jutro neurobiologii (“Neurobiology Today and Tomorrow”, published by Ossolineum)
- 1993: Jak usprawnić pamięć (“How to Improve Memory”, published by Wydawnictwo Platan)
  The book was reissued twice (in 1995 and 1998). Sławomir Zagórski, a journalist of Gazeta Wyborcza, in a review of the book called it a page-turner. Małgorzata Czartoszewska of journal Życie Warszawy pointed its “usefulness and universality”.
- 2010: Mózg: fascynacje, problemy, tajemnice (“The Brain: Fascinations, Problems, Mysteries”, published by Wydawnictwo Homini, edited by Krzysztof Bielawski) – Kraków Book of the Month Award (January 2011)
- 2011: Piękno neurobiologii (“The Beauty of Neurobiology”, published by Wydawnictwo Homini)
  The book was published as a continuation of Mózg: fascynacje, problemy, tajemnice and contains mainly commentaries and interviews distributed in the media; apart from the scientific subjects, there are threads about the biography of the author. The title was taken from both the Vetulani blog and the interview conducted by Maria de Hernandez Paluch for the monthly Kraków. Sławomir Zagórski described in Gazeta Wyborcza the two books published by Homini as “extremely interesting”.
- 2015: Bez ograniczeń. Jak rządzi nami mózg (“No Limits. How the Brain Rules Us”, with Maria Mazurek, published by PWN)
- 2016: A w konopiach strach (“And Fear Lurks in the Hemp”, with Maria Mazurek, published by PWN)
- 2017: Sen Alicji, czyli jak działa mózg (“Alice’s Dreamland: How the Brain Works”, with Maria Mazurek, published by WAM Publishing House, posthumous edition)
  Literally translated as Alice's Dream, or How the Brain Works, a book for children awarded the “Wise Book of the Year” Award for the best popular science book of 2017 in two categories: award from the Jagiellonian University academic community and the Euclid Foundation for the Advancement of Science, and the online audience award. The book became a bestseller in Poland, selling until October 2018 in more than forty thousand copies. The Czech translation of the book was published on October 25, 2018, and translations into Russian, German and French were also started.
- 2018: Neuroerotyka. Rozmowy o seksie i nie tylko (“Neuroerotics. Conversations About Sex and More”, with Maria Mazurek, published by Znak, posthumous edition)

=== Interviews ===
- 2015: Mózg i błazen (“The Brain and the Jester”, interviewed by Marcin Rotkiewicz, published by Wydawnictwo Czarne)
- 2017: Ćwiczenia duszy, rozciąganie mózgu (“Exercises for the Soul, Stretching the Brain”, in conversation with a Catholic priest Grzegorz Strzelczyk, edited by Michał Jędrzejek, published by Znak)

=== Translations ===
- 2010: Carlton K. Erickson, The Science of Addiction: From Neurobiology to Treatment (Polish translation published by Wydawnictwo Uniwersytetu Warszawskiego)

== Awards and honors ==
- Awards of the Scientific Secretary of the Polish Academy of Sciences (team, 1972, 1977);
- Awards of the Faculty of Medicine of the Polish Academy of Sciences (as team leader, 1982, 1986, 1992);
- Medal of the 40th Anniversary of People's Poland (1984);
- Gold Badge of the Copernicus Polish Society of Naturalists (1986);
- International Anna-Monika Prize (2nd class, 1983);
- Gold badge of the Polish Copernicus Society of Naturalists (1986);
- an honorary member of the Indian Academy of Neurosciences (1988);
- Gold Cross of Merit (1990);
- Nicolaus Copernicus Scientific Award (1996);
- an honorary member of the Polish Copernicus Society of Naturalists (1996);
- Jerzy Konorski Award granted by the Polish Neuroscience Society (2001);
- Prime Minister of Poland Award for the entirety of his scientific achievements (2003);
- Knight's Cross of Polonia Restituta (2004);
- Honoris causa degree from the Medical University of Silesia (2004);
- Jędrzej Śniadecki Medal for the entirety of his research in the field of psychopharmacology (2006);
- an honorary member of Polish Neuroscience Society (2007);
- Honoris causa degree from the Medical University of Łódź (2008);
- Honoris Gratia badge from the mayor of the Royal Capital City of Kraków (2009);
- Kraków Book of the Month (January 2011);
- Zbyszek Thielle Award from Polish Drug Policy Network “for uncompromising support with his scientific authority for the efforts to humanize Polish drug policy, for attitude of deep understanding of the problems of people who use and depend on psychoactive substances, for work and activities for the introduction of medical cannabis and the defense of the civil rights of its users” (2011);
- Rationalist of the Year from Polish Rationalists Society (2012);
- Special Award for in the competition "Science Popularizer" organised by PAP and the Ministry of Science and Higher Education the entirety of his popular work; justification stated that the scientist “brings to the reader not only the latest findings of neuroscientists, but also the socially important conclusions of these studies” (2012);
- Gazeta Krakowska Man of the Year (2014);
- Medal for Long Marital Life (2014);
- Starost of Gorlice Award (2016);
- Honorary Fellow of the Oxford Neurological Society (2017).

== Family tree ==
Vetulani family

* the list is incomplete

Michał Vetulani	Franciszka (née Śliwińska)
Jan	Matylda (née Pisz)	Roman	Elżbieta (née Kunachowicz)	Franciszek; Latinik	Franciszek	Katarzyna (née Ipohorska)
Eugeniusz	Kazimierz	Zygmunt	Tadeusz	Maria (née Godlewska)	Adam	Irena (née Latinik)	Zofia	Bohdan de Nisau	Maria	Cecylia
Armand	Wanda	Zygmunt	Grażyna (née Świerczyńska)	Krystyna	Jerzy	Maria (née Pająk)	Witold
Agnieszka	Maria	Charles	Tomasz

== Vetulani. Piękny umysł, dzikie serce ==
In 2022, his biography Vetulani. Piękny umysł, dzikie serce by Katarzyna Kubisiowska was published by Znak.

== Bibliography ==
- Rotkiewicz, Marcin (2015). Mózg i błazen. Rozmowa z Jerzym Vetulanim. Wołowiec: Wydawnictwo Czarne. ISBN 978-83-8049-092-5.
- Kobos, Andrzej (2007). Po drogach uczonych. Vol. 2. Kraków: Polish Academy of Learning. pp. 491–524.
- Nalepa, Irena (August 2016). "Prof. Jerzy Vetulani" (PDF). ptbun.org.pl. Archived from the original (PDF) on 4 January 2022.
- Kalęba, Julia (2017). Prezes Sekcji Geniuszy. Portret Jerzego Vetulaniego. Mando.
- "Profesor Jerzy Vetulani (1936–2017)" (PDF). PAUza – Tygodnik Polskiej Akademii Umiejętności. 5 April 2018.
- Irena Nalepa, Elżbieta Pyza (2016). "Jerzy Vetulani (1936–2017)" (PDF). Rocznik Polskiej Akademii Umiejętności: 243–249.
- Ryszard Przewłocki, Edmund Przegaliński. "Jerzy Vetulani – naukowiec, popularyzator neuronauki, artysta" (PDF). Nauka. 2/2017: 169–176.
- "In Memoriam Jerzy Vetulani" (PDF). The International Network for the History of Neuropsychopharmacology. Archived from the original (PDF) on 19 April 2022.
- Irena Nalepa, Lucyna Antkiewicz-Michaluk, Grzegorz Kreiner, Elżbieta Pyza, Jolanta Zawilska (2018). "Jerzy Vetulani (1936–2017). O mentorze, przyjacielu i niepokornym wirtuozie naukowej narracji" (PDF). Kosmos. 67 (2): 233–244. doi:10.36921/kos.2018_2382.
- Wybitni uczeni we wspomnieniach. Jerzy Vetulani (PDF). Warszawa: Biuro Upowszechniania i Promocji Nauki PAN. 2019. ISBN 978-83-63305-73-4. Archived from the original (PDF) on 20 December 2020.
- Kubisiowska, Katarzyna (2022). Vetulani. Piękny umysł, dzikie serce. Kraków: Znak. ISBN 978-83-240-7938-4.
- "Vetulani Jerzy Adam". Encyklopedia Krakowa. Vol. 2. Kraków: Biblioteka Kraków, Muzeum Krakowa. 2023. p. 662.
