= Krzysztof Wędzony =

Polish neuroscientist and neuropharmacologist (1955–2016)

- Born: 20 February 1955; Kraków
- Died: 19 November 2016 (aged 61); Kraków
- Occupations: Neuroscientist, neuropharmacologist

Academic background
- Education: Jagiellonian University

Krzysztof Tadeusz Wędzony (20 February 1955 – 19 November 2016) was a neuroscientist and neuropharmacologist, director of the Institute of Pharmacology of the Polish Academy of Sciences from 2007 to 2016, member of the Polish Academy of Arts and Sciences.

== Biography ==
In 1980 he graduated from the Faculty of Biology and Earth Sciences of the Jagiellonian University. In 1987 he obtained doctorate at the Institute of Pharmacology of the Polish Academy of Sciences. There, he obtained habilitation in 1998. Since 2001, he was head of the Laboratory of Pharmacology and Brain Biostructure at the Department of Pharmacology. Between 2003 and 2006 he was deputy director for scientific affairs at the Institute of Pharmacology.

His research activities focused primarily on the mechanism of action of antidepressants, the neurobiology and pharmacotherapy of schizophrenia, and the pharmacology of excitatory amino acid (NMDA) receptor antagonists. He authored almost 150 research papers. He supervised four doctoral dissertations.

He was described by Edmund Przegaliński and Ryszard Przewłocki as “a lover of literature, art, and music, as well as a photography and skiing enthusiast”. He was buried at the Salwator Cemetery.

== Accolades ==
- Tadeusz Browicz Award (2001)
- Gold Cross of Merit “for merits in scientific and organizational work” (2005)
- Nicolaus Copernicus Scientific Award (2005)
- Award of the Polish Pharmacological Society
- Award of the Scientific Secretary of the Polish Academy of Sciences
