= Sulser =

Sulser is a surname. Notable people with the surname include:

- Beau Sulser (born 1994), American baseball player
- Claudio Sulser (born 1955), Swiss footballer
- Cole Sulser (born 1990), American baseball player
- Fridolin Sulser (1926–2016), Swiss-American pharmacologist
