= Jacek Spławiński =

Polish pharmacologist (1937–2021)

- Born: 8 August 1937; Kraków
- Died: 1 February 2021 (aged 83); Warsaw
- Citizenship: Polish
- Education: Medical Academy in Kraków
- Occupation: clinical pharmacologist

Jacek Spławiński (8 August 1937 – 1 February 2021) was a Polish pharmacologist specializing in clinical pharmacology, professor of medical sciences, ECFMG certified doctor and author and co-author of more than 100 scientific papers.

== Life and work ==
In 1963 he graduated from medical studies at the Medical Academy in Kraków. After completing doctoral studies at the Institute of Pharmacology of the Polish Academy of Sciences he received a Ph.D. He completed a two-year scientific internship at the Department of Clinical Pharmacology of Vanderbilt University in Nashville, Tennessee. He worked at Vanderbilt University simultaneously with his friend Jerzy Vetulani. For several years he managed the research of the Maria Curie-Skłodowska Fund. He passed the Educational Commission for Foreign Medical Graduates and became a specialist in the field of clinical pharmacology. He published as an author or co-author over one hundred scientific papers.

He worked at the Narodowy Instytut Leków (National Institute of Medicine) in Poland, retiring in 2009. He received a number of awards for his work, including the Award of the Polish Pharmacological Society (1980) and the Award of the Scientific Council of the Minister of Health of Poland (1979, 1985, 1994). He represented Poland in several European Commission working groups on medicines. He was a member of the Polish Pharmacological Society, the Polish Pharmacoeconomic Association, the American Society for Clinical Pharmacology and Therapeutics, the International Society for Pharmacoeconomics and Outcomes Research (ISPOR), and the Drug Information Association.

He was married to the poet Elżbieta Zechenter-Spławińska.

In 2015, Poligraf Publishing House released his memoirs Gwizdać na Stalina! Zakopane 1949–1953: wspomnienia gimnazjalisty (Whistling on Stalin! Zakopane 1949–1953: memories of a middle school student).

== Death ==
Spławiński died on 1 February 2021.
