= Suchon =

Suchon may refer to:

People with the surname:

- Eugen Suchoň (1908–1993) Slovak composer
- Gabrielle Suchon (1632–1703), French moral philosopher
- Mirosław Suchoń (born 1976), Polish politician
- Sylwia Tomecka-Suchoń (born 1951), Polish geophysicist, professor

People with the given name:

- Suchon Sa-nguandee (born 1982), Thai footballer

Other:

- Suchon, a Jamoat of Tajikistan
- Suchon station, railway station in North Korea
