= Institute of Pharmacology of the Polish Academy of Sciences =

Scientific institute of the Polish Academy of Sciences based in Kraków

- Instytut Farmakologii Polskiej Akademii Nauk
- Type: Scientific
- Established: 1954
- Location: ul. Smętna 12; 31-343 Kraków, Kraków, Poland
- Website: http://if-pan.krakow.pl/ifpan_ww/

Institute of Pharmacology of the Polish Academy of Sciences (Polish: Instytut Farmakologii Polskiej Akademii Nauk) is a scientific Institute of the Polish Academy of Sciences, based in Kraków.

Established in 1954 as the Department of Pharmacology of the Polish Academy of Sciences, it was transformed into an independent institute in 1974. The main research subject of the institute is neuropsychopharmacology, and it conducts doctoral studies in this specialty. It has its own botanical garden.

The first manager of the Department of Pharmacology of the Polish Academy of Sciences was Janusz Supniewski.

The Institute publishes a scientific journal Pharmacological Reports in English.

== Directors ==
- Janusz Supniewski (1954–1964)
- Józef Hano (1964–1977)
- Jerzy Maj (1977–1993)
- Edmund Przegaliński (1993–2006)
- Krzysztof Wędzony (2007–2016)
- Władysław Lasoń (2017–2019)
- Małgorzata Filip (2021–2025)
- Katarzyna Starowicz-Bubak (from 2025)

== Researchers ==
- Lucyna Antkiewicz-Michaluk
- Władysława Anna Daniel
- Krystyna Gołembiowska
- Irena Nalepa
- Andrzej Pilc
- Piotr Popik
- Barbara Przewłocka
- Ryszard Przewłocki
- Marek Sanak
- Jacek Spławiński
- Jerzy Vetulani
- Agnieszka Wąsik
- Stanisław Wolfarth
