= Elżbieta Zechenter-Spławińska =

Polish poet (born 1935)

- Born: Elżbieta Zechenter; 17 July 1935 (age 91); Kraków, Poland
- Education: Jagiellonian University
- Known for: Poet; author of children's books
- Spouse: Jacek Spławiński

Elżbieta Zechenter-Spławińska (born 1935) is a Polish poet, translator, prose writer, and teacher. Between 1972 and 1976 she was the literary director of the State Puppet Theatre Rabcio in Rabka-Zdrój and between 1978 and 1987 the director of the Animated Film Studio in Kraków.

== Early life and education ==
Zechenter-Spławińska was born on 17 July 1935 in Kraków, the daughter of the poet, satirist and journalist, Witold Zechenter, and granddaughter of the journalist Edmund Zechenter. She published memoirs of her father in 2007. She graduated in Polish philology from the Jagiellonian University and obtained a PhD in humanities from the Pedagogical Academy in Kraków.

== Career ==
She made her debut with a New Year's Eve epigram in the magazine, Sztandar Młodych, in 1955. In the late 1950s and early 1960s, she was associated with the Muszyna poetry group. She has published poems in several literary magazines, such as Życie Literackie, Odgłosy, Oficyna Poetów i Malarzy, Dekada Literacka, Sycyna, and Twórczość, and in children's magazines such as Świerszczyk and Króliczek. Zechenter-Spławińska is also the author of stories for children. Her works were sung by the Wawele band and by cabaret artists at the Piwnica pod Baranami literary cabaret and elsewhere. She published many volumes of poems and several books of prose, and her works have also been included in anthologies in Poland and in translation in Hungary, the UK, Germany, Russia, the Czech Republic and Turkey. They also appear in school textbooks.

Between 1972 and 1976 she was the literary director of the State Puppet Theatre "Rabcio" in Rabka-Zdrój and between 1978 and 1987 the director of the Animated Film Studio in Kraków. From 1990, she ran literary workshops at the Cyprian Kamil Norwid Cultural Centre, and from 1995 workshops for young people at the Dr. Henryk Jordan Centre.

== Honours and awards ==
In January 1997, she received the Krakow "Book of the Month" award for her volume of poems Czapka niewidka. After that she became a member of the jury for the award, serving in that position for 25 years, until October 2022.

In 2014–2015, one hundred of the benches in Planty Park in Kraków had a name plate added to them of an author who either came from or in some cases was closely connected with Kraków. This was one of the activities associated with the Kraków UNESCO City of Literature celebrations of 2014. Zechenter-Spławińska was one of those recognised.

In 2015 she received the Honoris Gratia Badge awarded by the Mayor of Kraków.

== Personal life ==
Her husband was Jacek Spławiński, a pharmacologist, who died in 2021. Their son, Grzegorz Spławiński, became a translator of Polish poetry into French.
