= Lucyna Antkiewicz-Michaluk =

Polish pharmacologist

- Education: Jagiellonian University
- Occupation: Pharmacologist
- Awards: Nicolaus Copernicus Scientific Award

Lucyna Róża Antkiewicz-Michaluk is a pharmacologist, professor of medical sciences, professor at the Jerzy Maj Institute of Pharmacology of the Polish Academy of Sciences.

== Biography ==
In 1969, she graduated with a degree in biology from the Jagiellonian University. In 1970, she began working at the Department of Pharmacology of the Polish Academy of Sciences, where in 1976 she obtained a doctorate in natural sciences (physiology of the central nervous system) under the supervision of Jerzy Vetulani.

In 1986, she completed her habilitation in pharmaceutical sciences, specializing in pharmacodynamics, at the Faculty of Pharmacy of the Medical University of Krakow. In 1998, she was awarded the title of professor of medical sciences.

In 1995, together with Jerzy Vetulani, she received the Nicolaus Copernicus Scientific Award from the City of Kraków Foundation in the field of medicine for a series of twelve papers published between 1990 and 1994 on the modification of the action of neurotropic drugs by calcium channel blockers.

She ended her employment at the Institute of Pharmacology of the Polish Academy of Sciences in 2023. She was a supervisor in four doctoral dissertations, including that of Agnieszka Wąsik (2007).
