= Agnieszka Wąsik =

Neurochemist

- Occupation: Neurochemist

Academic background
- Education: Wyższa Szkoła Pedagogiczna w Krakowie
- Doctoral advisor: Lucyna Antkiewicz-Michaluk

Agnieszka Wąsik is a neurochemist, adiunkt at the Institute of Pharmacology of the Polish Academy of Sciences.

== Biography ==
In 1994 she graduated with a master's degree in biology from the Wyższa Szkoła Pedagogiczna w Krakowie. In 2007 she obtained doctorate at the Institute of Pharmacology of the Polish Academy of Sciences upon dissertation Przeciwuzależnieniowy potencjał endogennej substancji 1-metylo-1,2,3,4-tetrahydroizochinoliny oceniany eksperymentalnie w badaniach behawioralnych i neurochemicznych supervised by Lucyna Antkiewicz-Michaluk. In 2018 she obtained habilitation. Her research interests include Parkinson's disease, depression and neurotoxicity.
