= Władysława Anna Daniel =

Polish pharmacologist

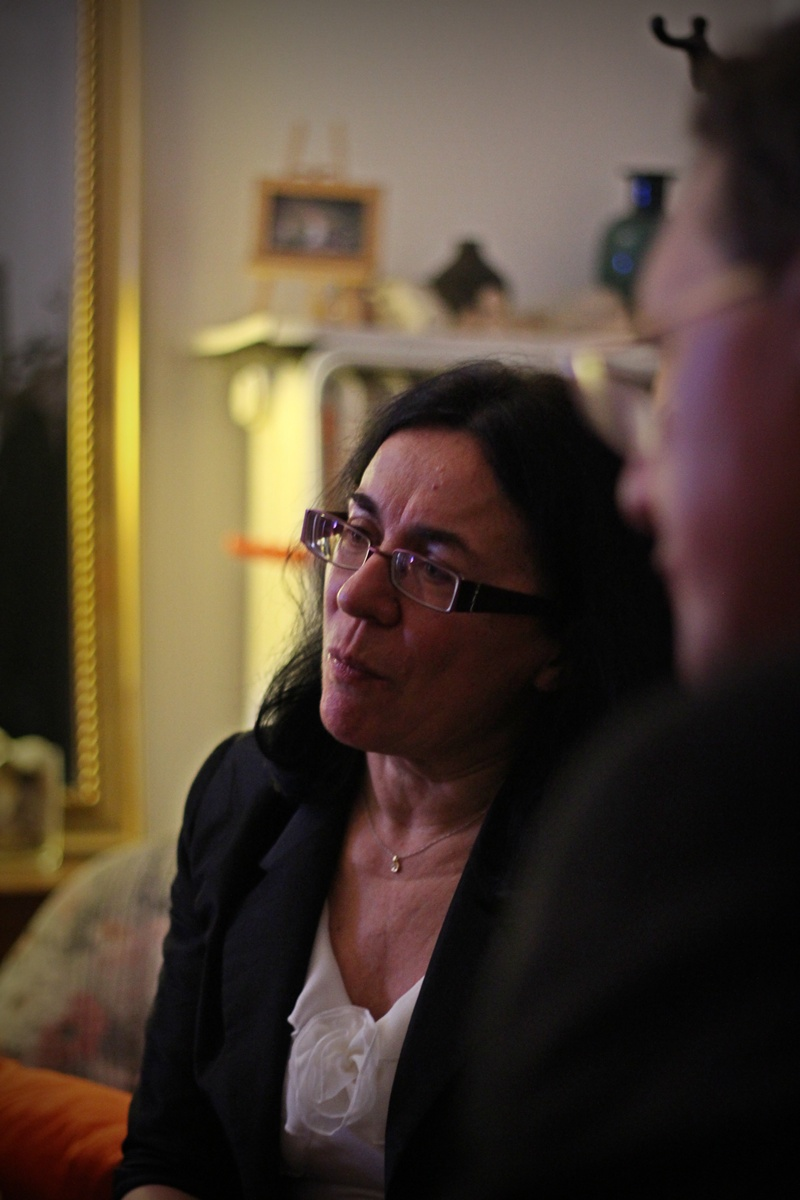
- Daniel in 2014
- Died: 7 August 2026
- Occupation: Pharmacologist

Academic background
- Education: Medical Academy in Kraków

Władysława Anna Daniel (died 7 August 2026) was a pharmacologist, professor at the Institute of Pharmacology of the Polish Academy of Sciences.

== Biography ==
Daniel graduated in pharmacy from the Medical Academy in Kraków in 1977. In 1980 she started work at the Institute of Pharmacology of the Polish Academy of Sciences. In 1983 she obtained doctorate. In 1992 she obtained habilitation.

She authored 150 scientific papers in the area of pharmacokinetics and metabolism of psychotropic drugs; the physiological and pharmacological roles of the brain and liver cytochrome P450; and the neuroendocrine regulation of liver cytochrome P450.

She supervised five doctoral dissertations.

She played in a short film Hydrofobia (2013), credited as Anna Daniel.

She was buried at the Podgórski Cemetery.
