= Katarzyna Kubisiowska =

Polish writer and journalist (born 1971)

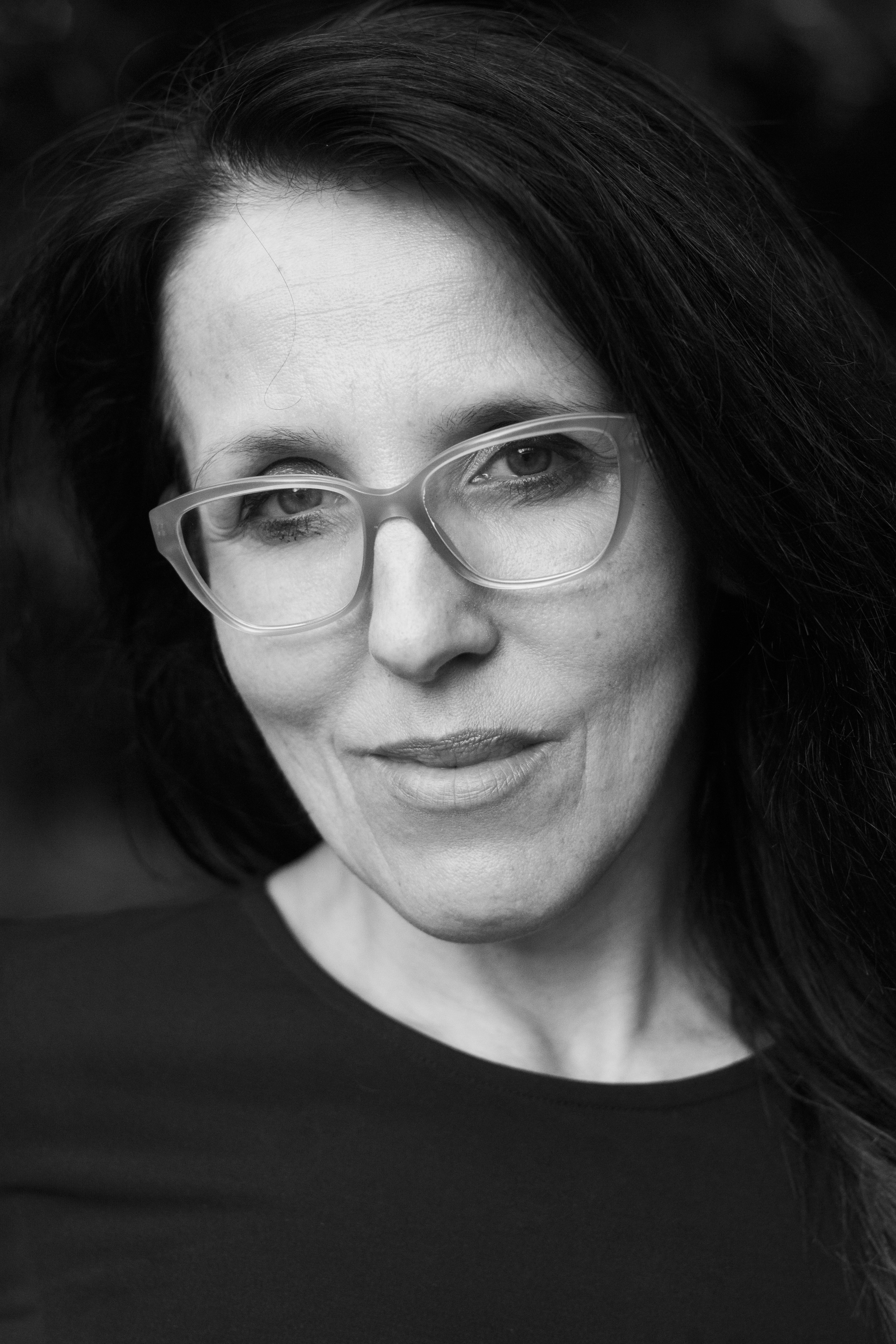
- Katarzyna Kubisiowska, 2019
- Born: 30 May 1971 (age 55); Kraków
- Citizenship: Polish
- Occupations: Journalist, writer

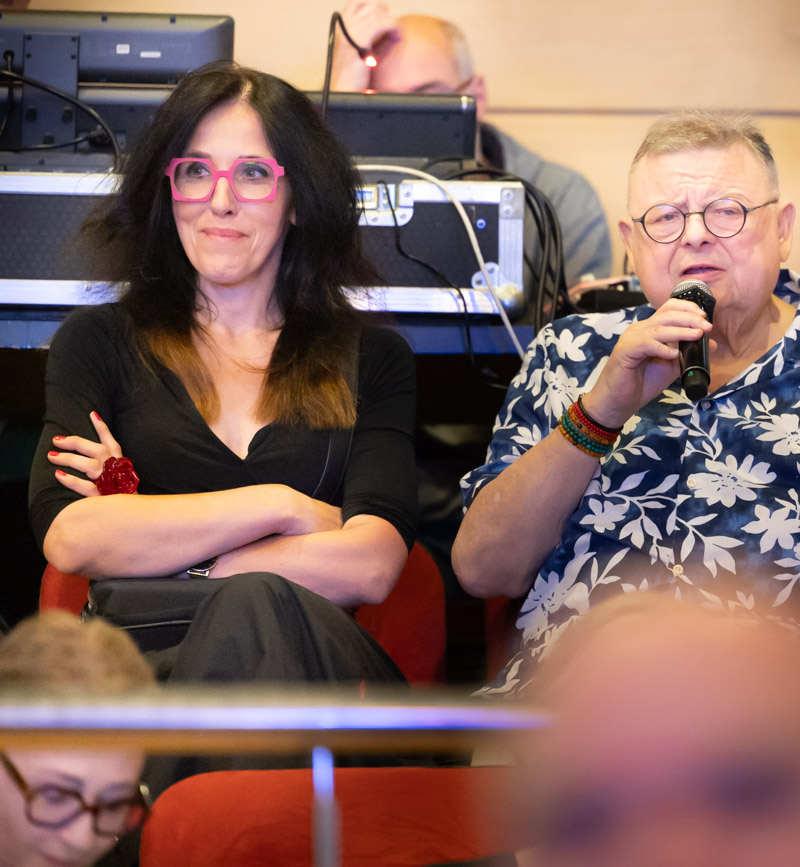
Katarzyna Kubisiowska and Wojciech Mann

Katarzyna Maria Kubisiowska (born 30 May 1971) is a Polish journalist and non-fiction writer, activist of the opposition in the Polish People's Republic, member of the editorial board of Tygodnik Powszechny.

== Biography ==
She is the daughter of Edward Kubisiowski and Anna née Kobiela; the younger sister of Piotr (born 1965). She has two children: Tadek and Hanka.

She passed her matura examination at August Witkowski 5th High School in Kraków. In the 1980s she was an activist of the Federation of Fighting Youth. In 1995, she graduated with a degree in film studies from the Jagiellonian University. She defended her master's thesis, The Motif of the House in Roman Polański's Films, written under the supervision of Tadeusz Lubelski.

She wrote, among others, biographies of Jerzy Pilch (Pilch w sensie ścisłym, 2016), Danuta Szaflarska (Szaflarska. Grać, aby żyć, 2019), Jerzy Vetulani (Vetulani. Piękny umysł, dzikie serce, 2022) and Kora (Kora. Się żyje, 2023), as well as two book interviews with Wojciech Mann (2020, 2024).

== Books ==
- Lektury na ekranie, czyli mały leksykon adaptacji filmowych, with Barbara Kosecka (Znak, 1999)
- Rak po polsku (Wydawnictwo Czarne, 2014)
- Pilch w sensie ścisłym (Znak, 2016)
- Szaflarska. Grać, aby żyć (W.A.B., 2019)
- Głos. Wojciech Mann w rozmowie z Katarzyną Kubisiowską (Znak, 2020)
- Blisko, bliżej. Rozmowy o tym, co najważniejsze (Znak, 2021)
- Vetulani. Piękny umysł, dzikie serce (Znak, 2022)
- Kora. Się żyje (Znak, 2023)
- Żar, żarliwość. Rozmowy o tym, co w nas płonie (Wydawnictwo Poznańskie, 2024)
- Echo. Wojciech Mann w rozmowie z Katarzyną Kubisiowską (Znak, 2024)

== Accolades ==
In 2015 she was a finalist of the Barbara Łopieńska Award for the interview with Jerzy Pilch published in Tygodnik Powszechny. Also in 2015 she received nomination for the Grand Press Award in the “Interview” category for the interview with Jerzy Pilch published in Gazeta Wyborcza. In 2019 she earned another Grand Press nomination in the “Interview” category for the interview with Andrzej Barański published in Tygodnik Powszechny. In 2013 and 2018 she earned nominations for the Małopolska Journalists' Award.

In 2022 she received Cross of Freedom and Solidarity.
