= Olga Jackowska =

Polish vocalist and songwriter

Kora Ostrowska
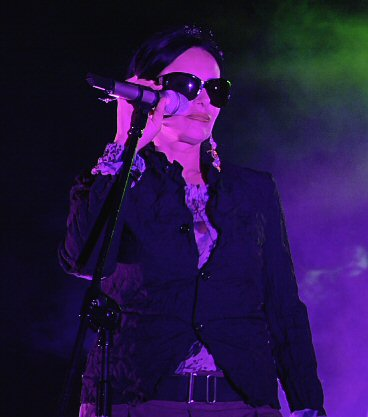
- Born: Olga Aleksandra Ostrowska; 8 June 1951; Kraków, Poland
- Died: 28 July 2018 (aged 67); Bliżów, Poland
- Occupations: Singer, television personality
- Spouse(s): Marek Jackowski (divorced); Kamil Sipowicz
- Children: 2 sons
- Parent(s): Marcin Ostrowski; Emilia Ostrowska
- Musical career
- Genres: Rock
- Instrument: Vocals
- Years active: 1976 – 2018
- Label: Kamiling Co
- Website: kora.org.pl

Olga Aleksandra Sipowicz (née Ostrowska; 8 June 1951 – 28 July 2018), also known by the mononym of Kora, was a Polish rock vocalist and songwriter. She was the lead singer of the rock band Maanam from 1976 to 2008. Jackowska also provided the voice of Edna Mode in the Polish dubs of both Incredibles films.

In 1971, Jackowska married rock musician Marek Jackowski, with whom she later founded the band Maanam. They divorced in 1984, and she gained custody of their children. In 2013, Jackowska married Kamil Sipowicz, writer, poet, and artist.

Jackowska was diagnosed with ovarian cancer in 2013, and she died from the disease on 28 July 2018, aged 67.

== Discography ==
Year	Title	Peak chart positions	Certifications (sales thresholds)
Year	Title	POL	Certifications (sales thresholds)
1993	Ja pana w podróż zabiorę: Date: 1993; Label: Kamiling Co	—	
2001	Złota Kolekcja. Magiczne słowo – sukces: Date: 20 July 2001; Label: Pomaton EMI	—	
2003	Kora Ola Ola!: Date: 17 February 2003; Label: Polskie Radio/Kamiling Co/BMG Poland	1	
2008	Metamorfozy (with 5th Element): Date: 26 September 2008; Label: Kamiling Co/Universal Music Polska	19	
2011	Ping Pong: Date: 10 November 2011; Label: Kamiling Co/EMI Music Poland	16	POL: Gold
2012	Ping Pong − Małe wolności: Date: 27 November 2012; Label: Kamiling Co/EMI Music Poland	—	
"—" denotes a recording that did not chart.

== Book about Kora ==
In 2023 Znak published a biographical book about Kora, Kora. Się żyje by Katarzyna Kubisiowska.
