= Carlton K. Erickson =

American pharmacologist

- Occupations: Pharmacologist, toxicologist

Academic background
- Education: Purdue University

Carlton K. Erickson is Professor Emeritus of Pharmacy, and former Director of the Addiction Science Research and Education Center in the College of Pharmacy at The University of Texas at Austin.

== Biography ==
He was trained as a pharmacist, received his Ph.D. in pharmacology from Purdue University. He taught 13 years at the University of Kansas, and was recruited to University of Texas at Austin to become the Division Head of Pharmacology and Toxicology in 1978. He is the author of over 170 peer-reviewed and professional publications, and five books. He retired from the University of Texas in May, 2018. He lives in Austin with his wife Eunice, who is a retired pharmacist.

He was elected a member of Research Society on Alcoholism, College on Problems of Drug Dependence and American College of Neuropsychopharmacology.

== Books ==
- Alcoholism and Affective Disorders: Clinical, Genetic, and Biochemical Studies, SP Medical & Scientific Books (New York, NY), 1979. Editor, with Donald W. Goodwin.
- Addiction Potential of Abused Drugs and Drug Classes, Haworth Press (New York, NY), 1990. Editor, with others.
- Your Brain on Drugs, a pamphlet, Hazelden, 1996. With John O'Neill.
- Drugs, the Brain, and Behavior: The Pharmacology of Abuse and Dependence, Haworth Medical Press (New York, NY), 1998. With John Brick.
- Comparative Pharmacological Profiles of Abused Drugs, Texas Commission on Alcohol and Drug Abuse (Austin, TX), 1998.
- The Science of Addiction: From Neurobiology to Treatment, W.W. Norton (New York, NY), 2007. The second edition, 2018.

The translation of The Science of Addiction: From Neurobiology to Treatment into Polish by Jerzy Vetulani was published by the Warsaw University Press in 2011.

== Awards ==
- Betty Ford Center Visionary Award, 2000;
- Pat Fields SECAD Award, 2003;
- Fred French Award for Educational Achievement, 2004;
- Nelson J. Bradley Award for Lifetime Achievement, 2007;
- John P. McGovern Award for Excellence in Medical Education, 2009;
- the Annual Award from the American Society of Addiction Medicine, 2013.

Source.
