= Stanisław Wolfarth =

Pharmacologist, neuroscientist and politician (1933–2007)

- Born: 10 February 1933; Gostyń
- Died: 20 November 2007 (aged 74); Kraków
- Occupations: Pharmacologist, neuroscientist
- Employer: Institute of Pharmacology of the Polish Academy of Sciences

Academic background
- Education: Medical Academy in Kraków

Stanisław Bronisław Wolfarth (10 February 1933 – 20 November 2007) was a pharmacologist, neuroscientist and politician.

== Biography ==
He was the son of Juliusz Wolfarth, great-grandson of Franciszek Wolfarth. His father died in 1942 in KL Auschwitz. During the Nazi occupation, Stanisław Wolfarth was taught at home in Poznań by priest Stefan Tabor.

In 1963 he graduated from the Copernicus Medical Academy in Kraków. In 1969 he obtained doctorate at the Department of Pharmacology of the Polish Academy of Sciences (Zakład Farmakologii PAN), upon dissertation titled in Polish: Wpływ estrów alkoholu 3,4,5-trójmetoksybenzylowego na centralny system nerwowy. In 1977 he obtained habilitation. In the years 1980–1981 he was an activist of Solidarity. In 1991 he supervised doctoral dissertation of Jadwiga Wardas.

He was Head of the Laboratory and Department of Neuropsychopharmacology at the Institute of Pharmacology of the Polish Academy of Sciences from 1971 to 2003. He retired in 2003. He was a member of Citizens' Movement for Democratic Action, Democratic Union and Freedom Union.

== Awards ==
- Gold Cross of Merit

== Bibliography ==
- Kto jest kim w polskiej medycynie. Informator biograficzny. 1987. pp. 726–727. ISBN 83-223-2339-5.
- Ossowska, Krystyna. "Professor Stanisław Wolfarth, Ph.D., M.D. (1933–2007). Obituary" (PDF). ptbun.org.pl. Archived from the original (PDF) on 20 May 2024.
