= Jolanta Zawilska =

Polish neuropharmacologist and chronobiologist

- Citizenship: Polish
- Education: Medical Academy of Łódź
- Occupations: Neuropharmacologist, chronobiologist

Jolanta Barbara Zawilska is a neuropharmacologist and chronobiologist, professor of pharmaceutical sciences, head of the Department of Pharmacodynamics at the Medical University of Łódź.

== Biography ==
In 1979, she graduated from the Faculty of Pharmacy, Medical Academy of Łódź. In 1982, she began working at the Department of Pharmacodynamics at that academy. In 1985, she obtained a PhD in pharmaceutical sciences. In 1994, she obtained her habilitation in pharmaceutical sciences. In 1998, she obtained the title of professor of pharmaceutical sciences. In the years 1992–2004 she worked at the Department of Biogenic Amines of the Polish Academy of Sciences in Łódź, and after its transformation she continued to work as a full professor at its successor, the Institute of Medical Biology of the Polish Academy of Sciences. Jolanta Zawilska has published 167 scientific articles and eight chapters in textbooks. She has supervised eight doctoral dissertations (until 2025).

== Books ==
- Receptory i mechanizmy przekazywania sygnału. Jerzy Z. Nowak, Jolanta B. Zawilska (ed.) (2 ed.). Warszawa: Wydawnictwo Naukowe PWN. 2004. ISBN 978-83-01-13865-3.
- Zawilska, Jolanta B.; Andrzejczak, Dariusz; Wojcieszak, Jakub (2016). „Dopalacze” i leki OTC – nowi gracze na scenie związków psychoaktywnych. Warszawa • Łódź: Polska Akademia Nauk • Uniwersytet Medyczny w Łodzi. ISBN 978-83-63305-32-1.
