= Jerzy Pilch =

Polish writer (1952–2020)

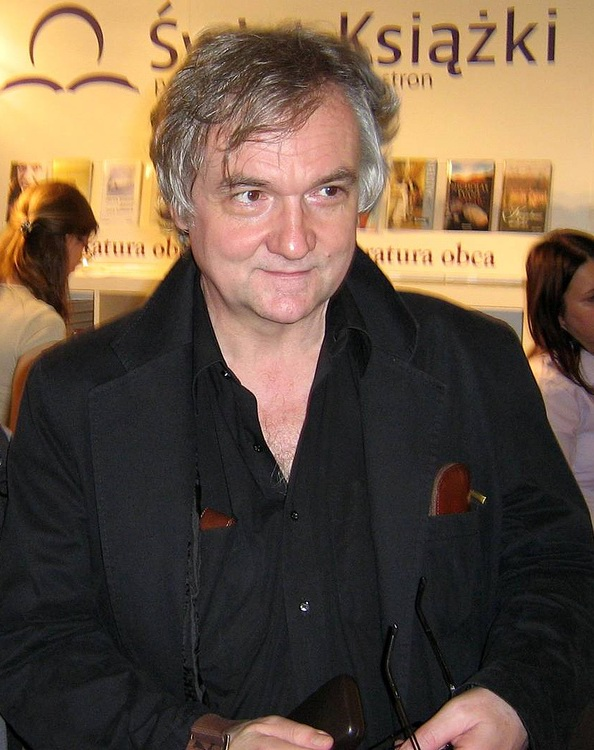
- Born: 10 August 1952; Wisła, Poland
- Died: 29 May 2020 (aged 67); Kielce, Poland
- Education: Jagiellonian University
- Occupations: Writer, journalist
- Awards: Nike Award (2001); Paszport Polityki Award (1998); Kraków Book of the Month Award (1998); Kościelski Award (1989)

Jerzy Pilch (Polish pronunciation: [ˈjɛʐɨ ˈpilx]; 10 August 1952 – 29 May 2020) was a Polish writer, columnist, and journalist. He is the winner of the 2001 Nike Award for his novel Pod Mocnym Aniołem. Critics have compared Pilch's style to Witold Gombrowicz, Milan Kundera, or Bohumil Hrabal.

== Early life and education ==
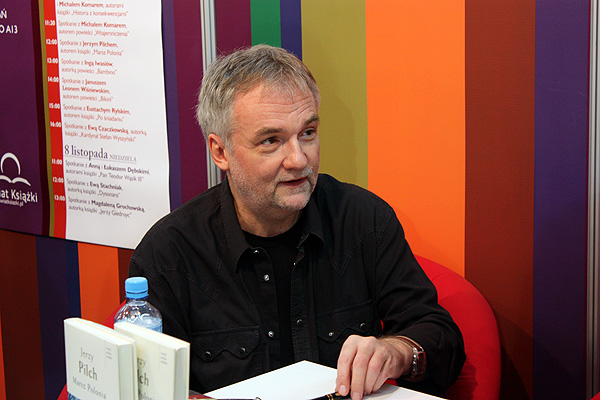
Jerzy Pilch at the Kraków Book Fair in 2009

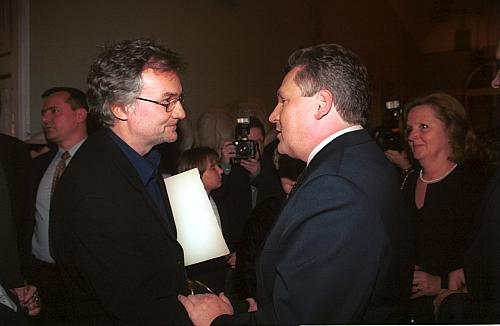
Jerzy Pilch (left) with president Aleksander Kwaśniewski

Born and raised in the small town of Wisła in the Beskids in southern Poland, Pilch studied Polish philology at the Jagiellonian University in Kraków and became active in the city's underground literary scene in the late 1970s. He began making his name under the martial law in the 1980s, by writing and reading essays for the "spoken magazine" Na Głos ("Out loud"), a regular spoken-word event organised by the oppositional Klub Inteligencji Katolickiej ("Club of Polish Catholic Intellectuals") (even though Pilch himself was Lutheran).

== Career ==
In 1989, Pilch began to contribute popular satirical essays for the Kraków-based liberal Catholic weekly Tygodnik Powszechny, which established him as a public intellectual. Pilch's best essays from his column in Tygodnik Powszechny appeared in three collections entitled Rozpacz z powodu utraty furmanki ("Despair caused by the loss of a wagon", 1994), Tezy o głupocie, piciu i umieraniu ("Theses On Stupidity, Drinking and Dying", 1995), and Bezpowrotnie utracona leworęczność ("The Irreversible Loss of Left-handedness", 1998).

Also in 1989, he was conferred the Kościelski Award for his debut novel Wyznania twórcy pokątnej literatury erotycznej ("Confessions of an Author of Illicit Erotic Literature"), an ironic insider's account of the Kraków art scene.

Pilch's second novel, Spis cudzołożnic ("List of Adulteresses", 1993), tells the story of a failed eccentric writer guiding a foreign guest on a tour of Kraków and through a curio collection of national myths and the absurd socialist realities of the 1980s. In 1995, actor Jerzy Stuhr made the novel into a film as his directing debut (under the international title List of Lovers).

The same year, Pilch published his third novel Inne rozkosze ("Other Pleasures"), the first to appear in English (as His Current Woman, 2002).

Pilch quit his work for Tygodnik Powszechny in 1999, left Kraków entirely, and settled in Warsaw, where he began to write a column for the weekly Polityka. A collection of texts from this series was published as Upadek człowieka pod Dworcem Centralnym ("The Fall of Man in Front of the Central Station") in 2002.

Pilch's most successful book so far is his fourth novel Pod Mocnym Aniołem ("The Mighty Angel", 2000), a satirical take on the "drinking novel" genre, which was awarded a Nike Award, the prestigious Polish literary award, the following year. In 2009, it was translated into English as The Mighty Angel, and in 2010, Tysiąc spokojnych miast was also translated as A Thousand Peaceful Cities.

Several of Pilch's books have been translated into Bulgarian, Dutch, English, Estonian, French, Lithuanian, Russian, Slovak, and Spanish.

== Death ==
Pilch died on 29 May 2020 from complications from Parkinson's disease.

== Books ==
- 1988: Wyznania twórcy pokątnej literatury erotycznej, Kraków: Wydawnictwo Literackie. ISBN 83-08-03379-2 ("Confessions of an author of illicit erotic literature")
- 1993: Spis cudzołożnic. Proza podróżna, Kraków: Wydawnictwo Literackie. ISBN 83-08-03193-5 ("List of adulteresses. Travel prose"; screen version under the international title List of Lovers, 1995).
- 1994: Rozpacz z powodu utraty furmanki, Kraków: Wydawnictwo Literackie. ISBN 83-08-03457-8 ("Despair caused by the loss of a wagon")
- 1995: Inne rozkosze, Kraków: Wydawnictwo "a5". ISBN 83-85568-44-1 ("Other pleasures"; translated as His Current Woman, Evanston, Ill.: Northwestern University Press/Hydra Books 2002, ISBN 0-8101-1918-8).
- 1996: Monolog z lisiej jamy, Kraków: Universitas. ISBN 83-7052-365-X ("Monologue from a foxhole")
- 1997: Tezy o głupocie, piciu i umieraniu, Kraków: Wydawnictwo Literackie. ISBN 83-08-03424-1 ("Theses on stupidity, drinking and dying")
- 1997: Tysiąc spokojnych miast, Kraków: Wydawnictwo Literackie. ISBN 83-08-03243-5 ("Thousand silent cities"; translated as A Thousand Peaceful Cities, Rochester, NY: Open Letter Books 2010, ISBN 978-1-934824-27-6).
- 1998: Bezpowrotnie utracona leworęczność, Kraków: Wydawnictwo Literackie. ISBN 83-08-02909-4 ("The irreversible loss of left-handedness")
- 2000 (with Olga Tokarczuk and Andrzej Stasiuk): Opowieści wigilijne, Wałbrzych: Ruta. ISBN 83-912865-7-6 ("Christmas tales")
- 2000: Pod Mocnym Aniołem, Kraków: Wydawnictwo Literackie. ISBN 83-08-03072-6 ("The Strong Angel Inn"; translated as The Mighty Angel, Rochester, NY: Open Letter Books 2009, ISBN 978-1-934824-08-5).
- 2004: Miasto utrapienia, Warszawa: Wydawnictwo Świat Książki. ISBN 83-7391-370-X ("City of Woe")
- 2004: Narty Ojca Świętego, Warszawa: Wydawnictwo Świat Książki. ISBN 83-7391-728-4 ("The Holy Father's Skis")
- 2006: Moje pierwsze samobójstwo, Warszawa: Wydawnictwo Świat Książki. ISBN 83-247-0473-6 ("My First Suicide")

== Biographical book ==
In 2016, Znak published a biographical book about Jerzy Pilch, Pilch w sensie ścisłym by Katarzyna Kubisiowska.

== See also ==
- Andrzej Stasiuk
- Polish literature
- List of Polish writers
