= Piotr Popik =

Polish neuropsychopharmacologist

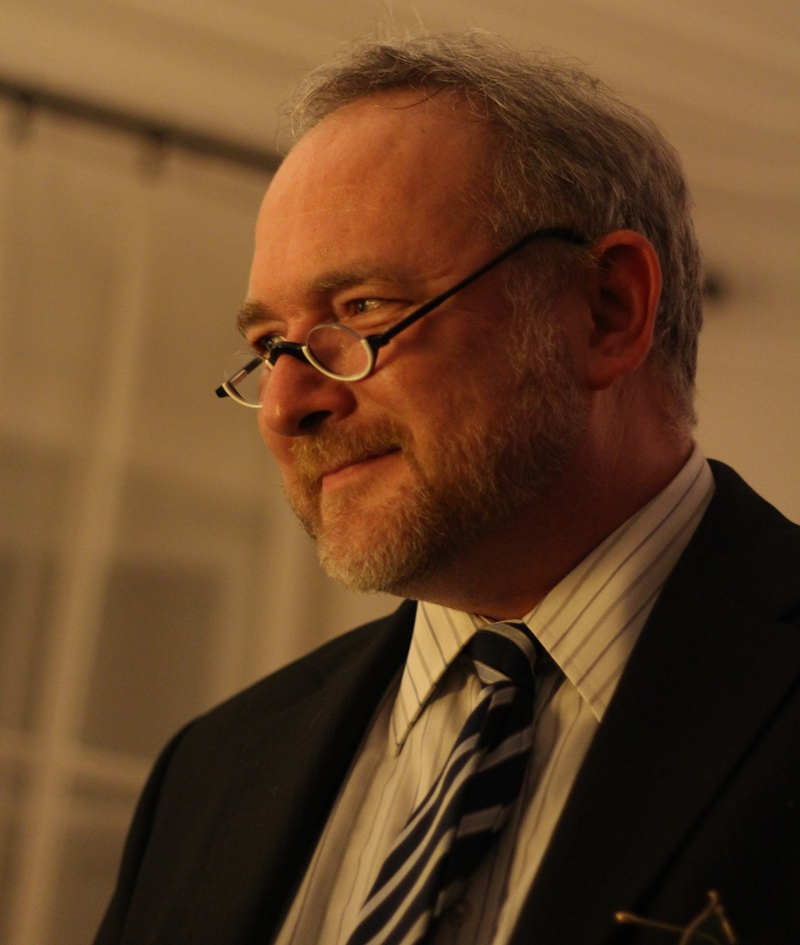
- Piotr Popik, 2014
- Born: November 18, 1962
- Citizenship: Polish
- Education: Jagiellonian University
- Occupation: neuropsychopharmacologist

Piotr Popik (born November 18, 1962) is a Polish neuropsychopharmacologist specializing in the research of drugs that affect the brain and conditions such as depression, drug addiction, cognitive and social disturbances as well as animal emotions and communication.

He is the author of more than 140 published papers and book chapters, and of the book on addictive substances for teenagers Dlaczego narkotyki (Why Drugs?, in Polish), published in 2000. Popik is the professor of medical sciences and the Head of Behavioral Neuroscience and Drug Development lab at the Institute of Pharmacology, Polish Academy of Sciences in Kraków; he also teaches pharmacology at the Jagiellonian University Medical College.

== Life and work ==
He obtained Medical Doctor degree from the Jagiellonian University Medical College in Kraków in 1988. Since 1985 he worked at the Institute of Pharmacology, Polish Academy of Sciences in Kraków in Jerzy Vetulani's lab. During years 1990–1991 he investigated the role of neuropeptides in learning and memory processes at Utrecht University with Jan M. Van Ree and David De Wied. He obtained Ph.D. from Utrecht University in 1991 (dissertation: Neurohypophyseal peptides and social recognition in rats). Between years 1993–1995, he received Fogarty International Fellowship at the National Institutes of Health and joined the team of Dr. Phil Skolnick. He worked on the role of NMDA receptors in the mechanism of action of antidepressants and drugs of abuse, including the drug ibogaine. For his work on antidepressants, he was co-awarded the Anna-Monika Prize. He is a member of the editorial committees of the journals Amino Acids and Pharmacology Biochemistry and Behavior. Presently, he is active in the fields of cognitive neuroscience, behavioral neuroscience and psychopharmacology.

== Selected papers ==
- Popik, P.; Vetulani, J.; van Ree, J. M. (1992). "Low doses of oxytocin facilitate social recognition in rats". Psychopharmacology. 106 (1): 71–74. doi:10.1007/BF02253591. ISSN 0033-3158. PMID 1738795. S2CID 32090956.
- Popik, P.; Layer, R. T.; Skolnick, P. (1995). "100 years of ibogaine: neurochemical and pharmacological actions of a putative anti-addictive drug". Pharmacological Reviews. 47 (2): 235–253. doi:10.1016/S0031-6997(25)06842-5. ISSN 0031-6997. PMID 7568327.
- Skolnick, P.; Layer, R. T.; Popik, P.; Nowak, G.; Paul, I. A.; Trullas, R. (1996). "Adaptation of N-methyl-D-aspartate (NMDA) receptors following antidepressant treatment: implications for the pharmacotherapy of depression". Pharmacopsychiatry. 29 (1): 23–26. doi:10.1055/s-2007-979537. ISSN 0176-3679. PMID 8852530.
- Bisaga, A.; Gianelli, P.; Popik, P. (1997). "Opiate withdrawal with dextromethorphan". The American Journal of Psychiatry. 154 (4): 584. doi:10.1176/ajp.154.4.584a. ISSN 0002-953X. PMID 9090360.
- Rygula, Rafal; Pluta, Helena; Popik, Piotr (2012). "Laughing rats are optimistic". PLOS ONE. 7 (12) e51959. Bibcode:2012PLoSO...751959R. doi:10.1371/journal.pone.0051959. ISSN 1932-6203. PMC 3530570. PMID 23300582.
