= Barbara Przewłocka =

Polish neuropharmacologist (born 1942)

- Born: 1942 (age 83–84)
- Citizenship: Polish
- Education: Jagiellonian University
- Occupation: Neuropharmacologist

Barbara Przewłocka (born 1942) is a Polish neuropharmacologist, professor of medical sciences, Head of the Drug Addiction Laboratory, then the Department of Pain Pharmacology at the Institute of Pharmacology of the Polish Academy of Sciences (1997–2016), member of the Polish Academy of Arts and Sciences.

== Biography ==
In 1965 she graduated in biology from the Jagiellonian University. In 1973 she obtained Ph.D. in natural sciences. In 1992 she obtained habilitation in medical sciences. In 2000 she obtained professorship in medical sciences.

Her research interests include the mechanisms of pain and the actions of endogenous opioid systems. She has published over 200 original scientific papers.

She was the principal investigator on over twenty grants awarded by the ministry of science and higher education, State Committee for Scientific Research, National Science Centre and National Centre for Research and Development, as well as three grants of European Economic Community. She was a member of the Central Commission for Degrees and Titles and vice-president of the Polish Society of Neuroscience. She co-organized the winter schools of the Institute of Pharmacology of the Polish Academy of Sciences. She was elected to the board of the Polish Society for the Study of Pain. She served on the editorial boards of several journals. She also served on the scientific council of the Marceli Nencki Institute of Experimental Biology of the Polish Academy of Sciences.

She edited a volume published on the occasion of the fiftieth anniversary of the Institute of Pharmacology of the Polish Academy of Sciences in Krakow.

== Awards ==
In 1998, together with Ryszard Przewłocki and Halina Machelska, she received the Tadeusz Browicz Award from the Medical Faculty of the Polish Academy of Arts and Sciences.

In 2010, she received the Nicolaus Copernicus Scientific Award from the City of Kraków Foundation in the field of medicine for “discoveries in explaining the mechanism of neuropathic pain, reflected in a number of publications in renowned global journals, constituting significant progress in medical research.”

In 2019, during the 11th Congress of the European Pain Federation (EFIC) in Valencia, she received the European Pain Federation Pain Champion award.
