= Jerzy Wordliczek =

Polish anesthesiologist (born 1953)

- Born: 10 August 1953 (age 72); Kraków
- Citizenship: Polish
- Occupation: anesthesiologist

Jerzy Władysław Wordliczek (born 10 August 1953) is a Polish anesthesiologist and academic, professor of medical sciences, Head of the Intensive Care Interdisciplinary Clinic of the Jagiellonian University Medical College. He is an author of more than three hundred scientific papers and Jagiellonian University Rector's Proxy for Clinical Affairs at the Medical College.

== Biography ==
Wordliczek graduated from the Medical Academy in Kraków. He received Ph.D. in medicine (with surgery speciality) in 1990 and the title of professor of medical sciences in 2005.

He is head of the Department of Intensive Interdisciplinary Care of the Jagiellonian University Medical College and head of the Center for Injury Disaster and Emergency Medicine of the University Hospital in Kraków.

He published more than 300 scientific articles and chapters in medicine textbooks, was an editor of nine textbooks, five monographic notebooks magazines on pain and its treatment, and five Polish editions (translations) of foreign textbooks. Since 2012 he is a Jagiellonian University Rector's Proxy for Clinical Affairs at the Medical College. He is a member of the editorial board of Palliative Medicine in Practice.

In 1989 Wordliczek, together with professor Andrzej Matyja, a surgeon, and Jerzy Kękuś founded the Specialized Center for Diagnostic and Therapeutic Medicina in Kraków. The three are now co-owners of the center, collaborating with about three hundred physicians from different fields.

In 2013 he received Gold Medal for Long Service.

== Books (selection) ==
- 2007: Leczenie bólu (with Jan Dobrogowski, Państwowy Zakład Wydawnictw Lekarskich) – second edition 2011, third edition 2017 (with Jan Dobrogowski and Małgorzata Krajnik, published by Wydawnictwo Lekarskie PZWL)
- 2014: Farmakoterapia bólu (with Jarosław Woroń and Jan Dobrogowski, published by Termedia)
- 2016: Chory na nowotwór. Kompendium postępowania w wybranych sytuacjach klinicznych (with Małgorzata Krajnik, Małgorzata Malec-Milewska, published by Medical Education)
