= Krystyna Gołembiowska =

Polish neuroscientist

- Citizenship: Polish
- Occupation: Neuroscientist

Krystyna Czesława Gołembiowska is a neuroscientist and professor at the Institute of Pharmacology of the Polish Academy of Sciences.

== Biography ==
In 1974 she graduated in biology from the Higher Pedagogical School in Kraków. In 1981 she obtained doctorate in natural sciences. In 2006 she obtained habilitation in medical biology (medical sciences). In 2014 she received the title of professor of medical sciences. She supervised three doctoral dissertations.

== Awards ==
In 2020 she received Bronze Cross of Merit.
