= Jerzy Maj =

Polish pharmacologist (1922–2003)

Jerzy Michał Maj
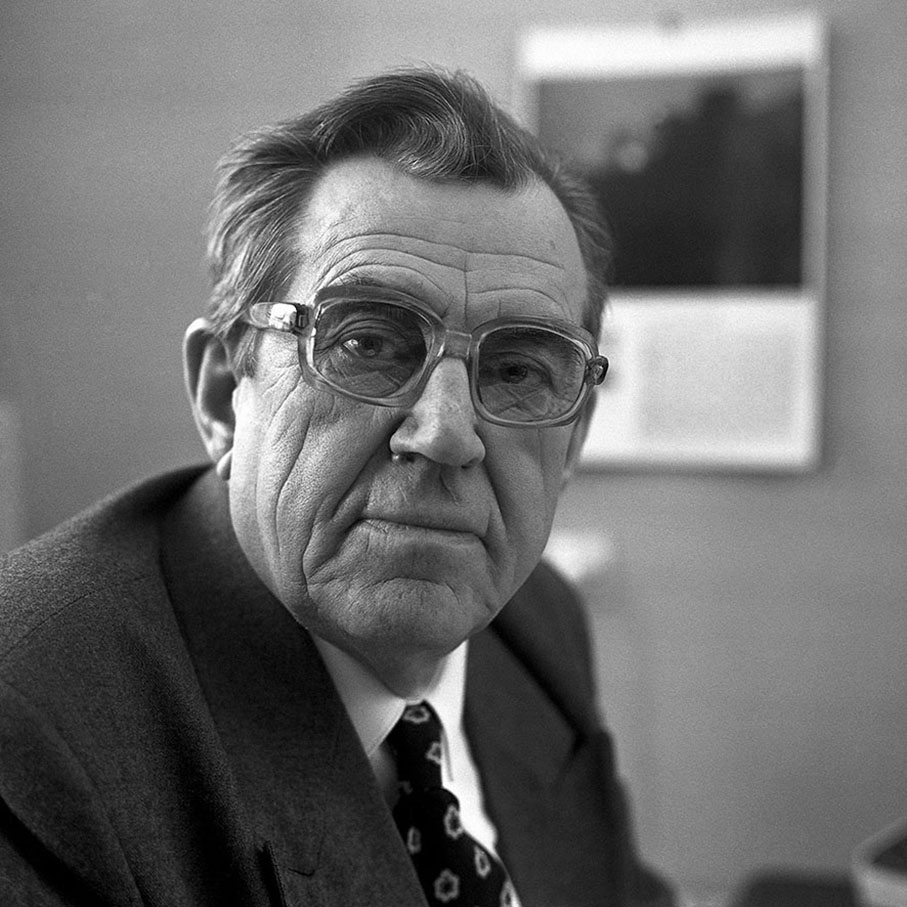
- Jerzy Maj (2011)
- Born: 14 July 1922; Brest-on-the-Bug
- Died: 9 February 2003 (aged 80); Kraków
- Citizenship: Polish
- Occupation: pharmacologist

Jerzy Michał Maj (14 July 1922 – 9 February 2003) was a Polish pharmacologist, professor of medical sciences, member of the Polish Academy of Sciences and the Polish Academy of Arts and Sciences, a director of the Institute of Pharmacology of the Polish Academy of Sciences (1977–1993).

== Biography ==
In 1949 he graduated in pharmacy from Jagiellonian University. He obtained his Ph.D. in 1951. In 1978 he received the title of professor.

In 1988 the Medical Academy of Lublin awarded him with a degree honoris causa.

Beside his scientific activity he was also a social activist as the chairman of the Jadwiga and Janusz Supniewski Foundation next to the Institute of Pharmacology.
