= Andrzej Kobos =

Polish physicist and writer (1943–2024)

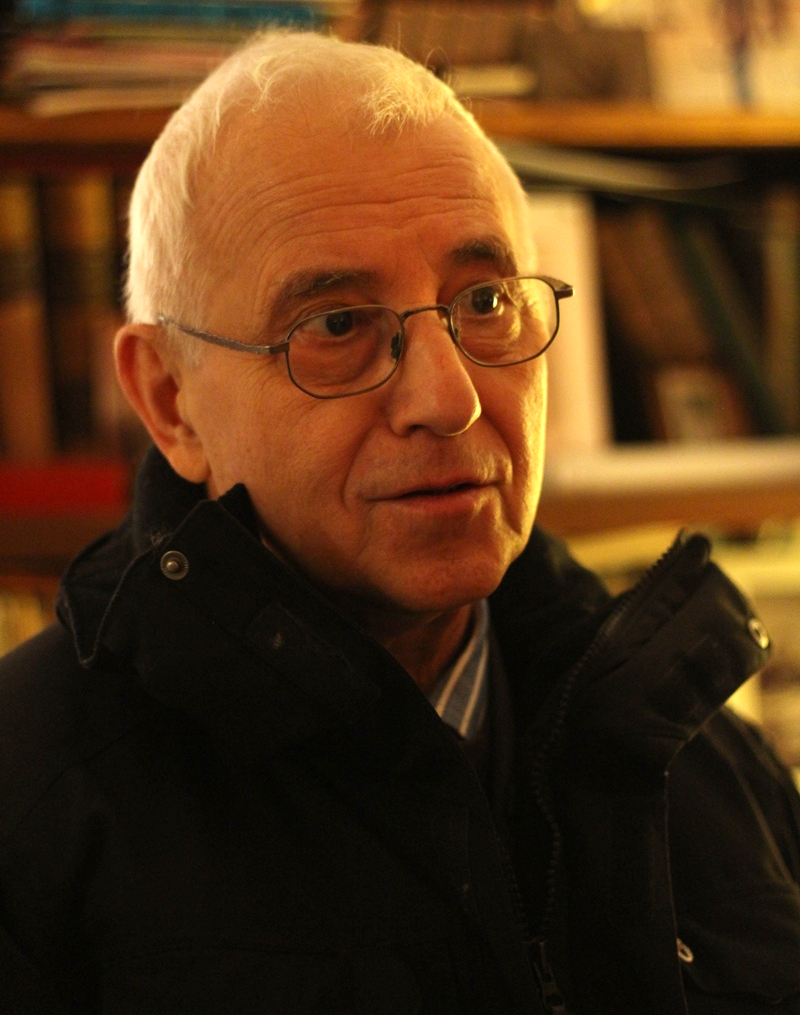
- Andrzej Kobos, 2014
- Born: 29 September 1943
- Died: 20 November 2024 (aged 81)
- Education: Jagiellonian University
- Occupations: Physicist, writer

Andrzej Michał Kobos (29 September 1943 – 20 November 2024) was a Polish physicist and writer who authored, among others, six volumes of interviews with members of the Polish Academy of Arts and Sciences in the series Po drogach uczonych (On the Paths of Scientists). He was a member of the Commission of the History of Science and the Commission of European Affairs of the Polish Academy of Arts and Sciences.

== Books ==
- Po drogach uczonych: z członkami Polskiej Akademii Umiejętności rozmawia Andrzej M. Kobos. Vol. 1. Polska Akademia Umiejętności. 2007.
- Po drogach uczonych: z członkami Polskiej Akademii Umiejętności rozmawia Andrzej M. Kobos. Vol. 2. Polska Akademia Umiejętności. 2007.
- Po drogach uczonych: z członkami Polskiej Akademii Umiejętności rozmawia Andrzej M. Kobos. Vol. 3. Polska Akademia Umiejętności. 2008.
- Po drogach uczonych: z członkami Polskiej Akademii Umiejętności rozmawia Andrzej M. Kobos. Vol. 4. Polska Akademia Umiejętności. 2009.
- Czasy „Solidarności” na Uniwersytecie Jagiellońskim 1980–1989 we wspomnieniach. Rozmawiał Andrzej M. Kobos. Wydawnictwo Uniwersytetu Jagiellońskiego. 2010.
- Po drogach uczonych: z członkami Polskiej Akademii Umiejętności rozmawia Andrzej M. Kobos. Vol. 5. Polska Akademia Umiejętności. 2012.
- Po drogach uczonych: z członkami Polskiej Akademii Umiejętności rozmawia Andrzej M. Kobos. Vol. 6. Polska Akademia Umiejętności. 2017.

== Translations from Polish to English ==
- Grodziski, Stanisław (2006). The Polish Academy of Arts and Sciences 1872–1952–2002. Polska Akademia Umiejętności.
- A turning point in particle physics: a volume dedicated to Stefan Pokorski on His 70th anniversary. Wydawnictwo Uniwersytetu Warszawskiego. 2012.
