= Andrzej Mikołaj Pilc =

Polish neuropharmacologist

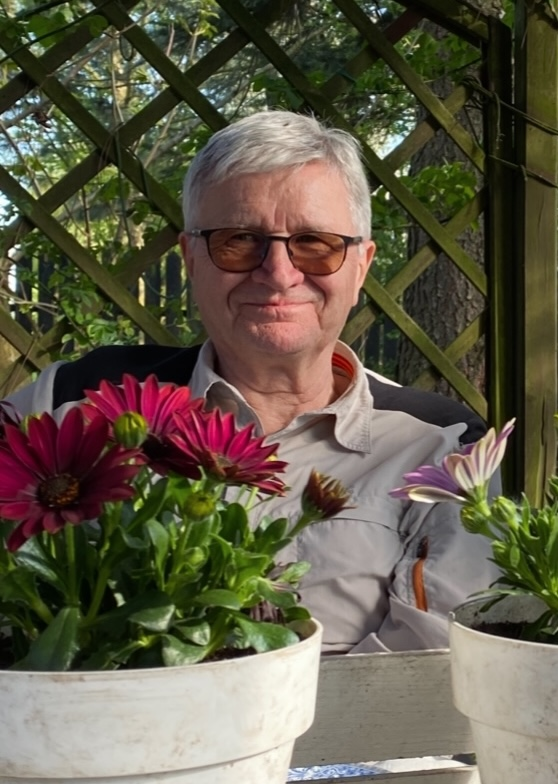
- Andrzej Pilc
- Born: 20 April 1948; Łódź, Poland
- Citizenship: Polish
- Education: Medical University of Łódź
- Occupation: neuropharmacologist
- Employer: Maj Institute of Pharmacology of the Polish Academy of Sciences

Andrzej Mikołaj Pilc (born 20 April 1948) is a Polish neuropharmacologist specializing in the psychopharmacology of anxiety and depression, professor at the Maj Institute of Pharmacology of the Polish Academy of Sciences in Krakow, and author of over five hundred scientific publications. He is a professor of medical sciences, a corresponding member of Division V of the Polish Academy of Sciences, an active member of the Medical Division of the Polish Academy of Arts and Sciences (PAU), and a researcher of metabotropic glutamate receptors. His scientific achievements include participation in discovering increased expression of GABA B receptors under the influence of antidepressants and the antidepressant and anxiolytic effects of mGluR5 metabotropic glutamate receptor antagonists.

== Scientific career ==
=== Scientific development ===
In 1972, he obtained his medical degree at the Medical Academy in Łódź. In 1977, he obtained Ph. D. degree at the Faculty of Medicine of the same academy. After obtaining his diploma, he completed postdoctoral internships at the Biological Research Centre of the Hungarian Academy of Sciences in Szeged, Hungary (1975-1976), at LERS-Synthelabo in Paris, France (1982-1983) and at the University of Texas (1984-1986).

In 1987, he received his habilitation degree with a specialization in experimental pharmacology at the Faculty of Medicine of the Medical Academy in Łódź. In 1992-1994, he worked as an associate professor at the Medical School of Kuwait University. In 1997, he was awarded the title of professor of medical sciences.

He served as head of the Department of Neurobiology at the Maj Institute of Pharmacology of the Polish Academy of Sciences in Krakow (1991–2019) and head of the Department of Drug Management at the Faculty of Public Health of the Jagiellonian University Medical College in Krakow (1997–2019).

=== Scientific work ===
During his postdoctoral fellowship at Synthelabo in Paris, he published papers on the effects of antidepressants and electroconvulsive therapy on metabotropic γ-aminobutyric acid (GABA B), which play a significant role in the pathophysiology of depression. He is co-author of studies indicating the involvement of α2-adrenergic receptors in the mechanism of action of antidepressants and a number of articles on the effects of histamine on the brain.

In the 1990's, he began researching metabotropic glutamate receptors (mGluRs), contributing to the discovery of the anxiolytic, antidepressant and anti-Parkinson's effects of ligands targeting these receptors. Later, his research focused on enhancing the antidepressant effects of hallucinogens through the modulation of mGluR ligands. He was listed among the top 2% most cited scientists in the world, ranking 891st out of 140,593 researchers in the field of pharmacology.

He is also known for his work in the field of scientometrics, especially as the creator of the first ranking of Polish scientists based on citation indices.

== Awards ==
He has received numerous prestigious awards throughout his career. In 2003 he was honored with the Tadeusz Browicz Award from the Faculty of Medical Sciences of the Polish Academy of Arts and Sciences. In 2008 he received the Jędrzej Śniadecki Award from the Faculty of Medical Sciences of the Polish Academy of Sciences and in 2019 the Jędrzej Śniadecki Medal.. Additionally, in 2004 he was awarded the Golden Cross of Merit. Ranked as Poland's top medical scientist by Top Medicine Scientists in 2022.
