= Fridolin Sulser =

Swiss-American pharmacologist (1926–2016)

- Born: 2 December 1926; Grabs, Switzerland
- Died: 3 January 2016 (aged 89)
- Education: University of Zurich
- Occupation: pharmacologist

Fridolin Sulser (2 December 1926 – 3 January 2016) was a Swiss-American pharmacologist who specialized in the treatment of mental disorders.

== Life and work ==
He was born in Grabs, Switzerland and grew up in the town of Maienfeld. He graduated from the Humanistische Gymnasium in Chur in 1947 and left to attend respectively school at the University of Basel (pre-clinical) and the University of Zurich (clinical), graduating from the latter with an M.D. in 1955. During his college years he was highly influenced by the works of Karl Jaspers. This influence has pushed him towards experimental biology, culminating in a decision to move from psychoanalysis to pharmacology. Before having been appointed assistant professor at the University of Bern, he served a mandatory 2-year term officer in the Swiss Army.

He moved with his family to the United States in the fall of 1958, having obtained a post-doctoral fellowship in neuropsychopharmacology at the National Institutes of Health in Bethesda, M.D, funded by Swiss Academy. At the time he established his long-standing interest in brain research. At the NIH, he started working in the laboratory of Bernard Brodie, focusing on the mechanism of action of imipramine. His collaboration with Jim Dingell at NIH led to the discovery of desmethylimipramine. In 1962 he went to Burroughs Wellcome Research Labs in New York as Head of Pharmacology. In 1965 he joined the Vanderbilt University Medical School Faculty as professor and Director of the Pharmacology Research Center. He gained recognition for an early hypothesis of the mechanism of action of antidepressant drugs, suggesting in 1975, together with Jerzy Vetulani, that downregulation of beta-adrenergic receptors is responsible for their effects. He was made professor emeritus of the university in 2000.

Sulser received several honors during his research career, including the Anna-Monika Prize. He was a Fellow and President of the American College of Neuropsychopharmacology as well as a Fellow of the Collegium International Neuro-Psychopharmacologium.

He died on January 3, 2016, and was survived by his brother Emil Sulser, wife, Johanna Mooser Sulser, and children Anna (Sulser) Newton, Adrian Sulser, Daniel Sulser, and Bettina (Sulser) Bryant and eight grandchildren.
