= Cecylia Vetulani =

Polish art historian and conservator-restorer (1908–1980)

- Born: 11 April 1908; Kraków
- Died: 2 January 1980 (aged 71)
- Citizenship: Polish
- Education: Academy of Fine Arts in Warsaw
- Occupations: art historian conservator-restorer

Cecylia Vetulani (11 April 1908 – 2 January 1980) was a Polish art historian and conservator-restorer who did research mostly in the field of Warmia and Masuria folk art. She was a custodian of the Museum of Warmia and Mazury in Olsztyn (1950–1956).

== Biography ==
She was the daughter of an engineer, Franciszek Vetulani (1856−1921), and Katarzyna Ipohorska-Lenkiewicz (1868−1915). She graduated from the Academy of Fine Arts in Warsaw in 1932. In 1935, she obtained licensing for teaching in high schools and started to work as a teacher. During World War II she lived in Warsaw with her sister Maria and nephew Witold. She took part in the Warsaw Uprising. In the spring of 1945, she moved to Olsztyn, where she decided to live and work.

She was a conservator at the Museum of Warmia and Mazury; she secured and catalogued various antiques and did restoration works. In 1950 she became a custodian of the museum. Since 1956, she worked at the antique shop in Olsztyn. She retired in 1959 as a disabled person.

She was the author of several works on folk art and regional history, and she published articles in such periodicals as „Słowie na Warmii”, „Warmia i Mazury”, „Przegląd Zachodni” and „Polska Sztuka Ludowa”. In 1972 she published her memoir titled Pionierzy i zabytki (Pioneers and Monuments) that focused mostly on her work in the museum. For her services in cultural heritage protection in the region she was awarded with a Gold Medal „For Antiques' Guardians”.

Memorabilia and documents related to Cecylia Vetulani were included in the exhibition Trudne początki. Muzeum Mazurskie w latach 1945–1950 (Difficult Beginnings: The Masurian Museum in 1945–1950) opened in November 2025 at the Museum of Warmia and Mazury.

== Bibliography ==
- Tadeusz Oracki: Twórcy i działacze kultury w województwie olsztyńskim w latach 1945–1970. Olsztyn: Ośrodek Badań Naukowych im. Wojciecha Kętrzyńskiego, 1975, pp. 99–101.
- Kamila Wróblewska: Cecylia Vetulani (1908–1980). „Komunikaty Mazursko-Warmińskie”, 1/1980, pp. 119–120.
- Syrwid, Robert (2012). ""Ambasadorka Watykanu", czyli Cecylii Vetulani potyczki z władzą ludową. Nieznany list do Komisji Kultury Wojewódzkiej Rady Narodowej w Olsztynie z 1955 roku" (PDF). Komunikaty Mazursko-Warmińskie. 2: 375–399.
