= Sylwia Tomecka-Suchoń =

Polish geophysicist (born 1951)

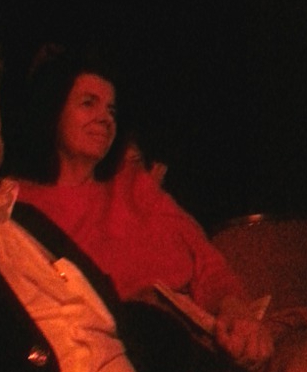
- Sylwia Tomecka-Suchoń, 2013
- Born: 25 March 1951 (age 75); Kraków
- Citizenship: Polish
- Education: AGH University of Kraków
- Occupation: Geophysicist

Sylwia Tomecka-Suchoń (born 25 March 1951) is a Polish geophysicist, professor at the AGH University of Kraków.

== Biography ==
In 1973, she graduated from the Faculty of Geology and Exploration of the AGH. In 1977, she began working at the Department of Computer Science of the Interdepartmental Institute of Applied Geophysics and Petroleum Geology (since 1980, the Interdepartmental Institute of Geophysics) of the Faculty of Geology and Exploration of the AGH.

In 1989, she obtained her doctorate from the Institute of Geophysics of the Polish Academy of Sciences. In 2012, she obtained her habilitation degree based on her dissertation Badania właściwości elektrycznych skał i gruntów dla rozpoznania struktury ośrodka skalnego przy powierzchni Ziemi (Studies of the Electrical Properties of Rocks and Soils for the Identification of the Structure of the Rock Medium at the Earth's Surface) presented at the Faculty of Geology, Geophysics and Environmental Protection of the AGH University of Science and Technology.

She has published approximately one hundred and forty scientific papers. She led research projects on the following: Georadar Measurements for Locating Mining Voids in Upper Silesia (1997–1999) and Research on the Inelastic Deformation Process of Rocks Subjected to Stress and Pore Pressure (2001–2003). She became a member of the Chief Technical Organization and the Stowarzyszenie Naukowo-Techniczne Inżynierów i Techników Przemysłu Naftowego i Gazowniczego (Scientific-Technical Association of Engineers and Technicians of the Oil and Gas Industry).

From the late 1970s to 2017, she maintained a close relationship with Jerzy Vetulani. She was awarded Bronze Badge of Merit for Mining in the Republic of Poland.

== Bibliography ==
- Kronika i spis absolwentów Akademii Górniczo-Hutniczej im. Stanisława Staszica 1919-1979. Vol. 1. Pion górniczy. Kraków. 1979. p. 214.
- Skład Osobowy AGH … 1982/83. Kraków. 1983. p. 36.
- Pikoń, Krzysztof, ed. (2004). Wielka Księga 85-lecia Akademii Górniczo-Hutniczej. Gliwice. p. 375.
