= Edmund Przegaliński =

Polish neuropsychopharmacologist (1937–2025)

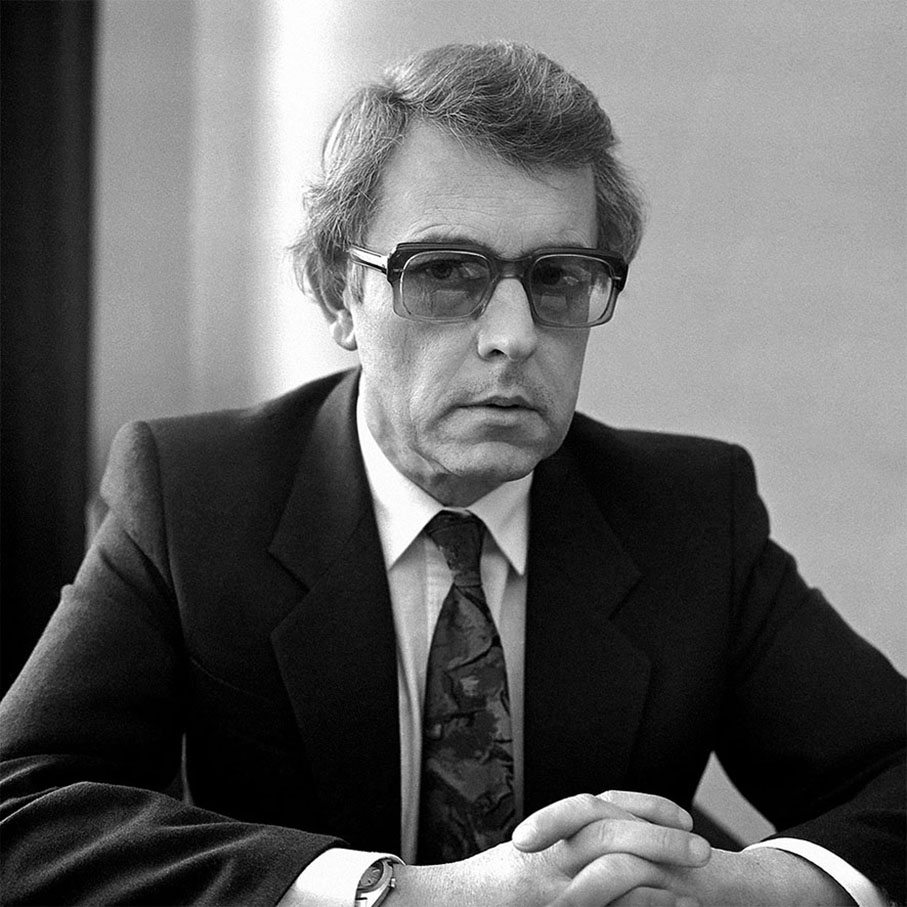
- Born: 26 November 1937; Biłgoraj
- Died: 13 July 2025 (aged 87); Kraków
- Occupation: Neuropsychopharmacologist

Edmund Konrad Przegaliński (26 November 1937 – 13 July 2025) was a Polish neuropsychopharmacologist, professor of medical sciences, member of the Polish Academy of Sciences and the Polish Academy of Arts and Sciences, director of the Institute of Pharmacology of the Polish Academy of Sciences in 1993–2007.

== Biography ==
He graduated from the Medical Academy of Lublin in 1961. He obtained his doctorate in medical sciences in 1968.

In 1991 he was elected a corresponding member of the Polish Academy of Sciences, and in 2004 its full member. In 1991 he was elected a member of the Polish Academy of Arts and Sciences.

== Bibliography ==
- Wielka encyklopedia PWN. Vol. XXII. Warszawa: Wydawnictwo Naukowe PWN. 2004. p. 414. ISBN 83-01-14116-6.
