= Ryszard Przewłocki =

Polish neuroscientist and neuropharmacologist (born 1943)

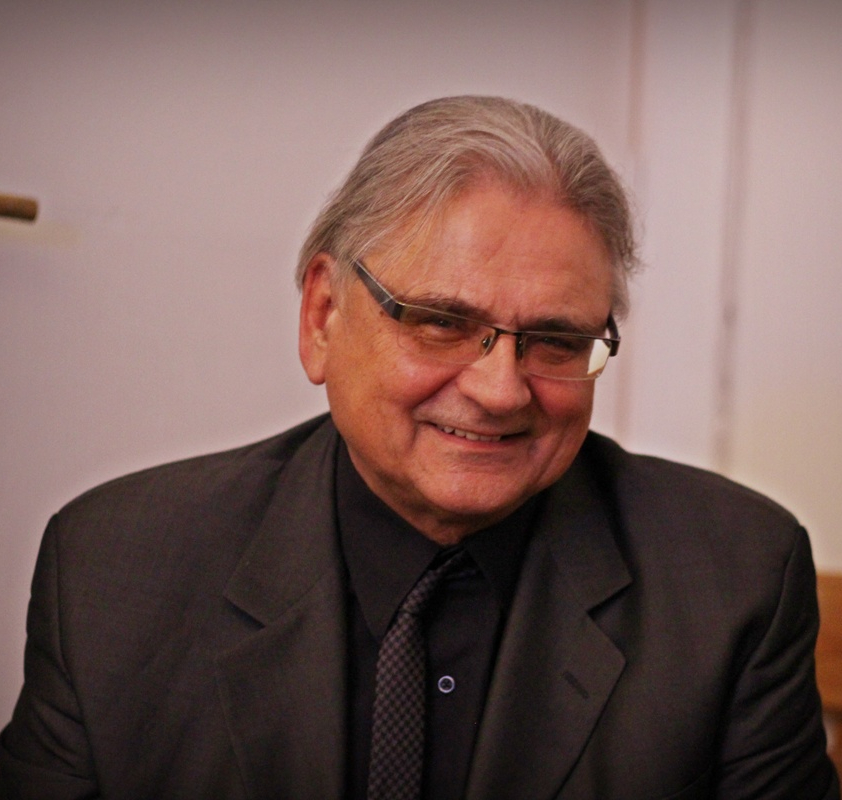
- Ryszard Przewłocki, 2014
- Born: October 25, 1943 (age 82)
- Citizenship: Polish
- Education: AGH University of Science and Technology; Jagiellonian University
- Occupations: Neurobiologist; Neuropharmacologist

Ryszard Przewłocki (born October 25, 1943) is a Polish neurobiologist and neuropharmacologist, professor of medical sciences, professor at the Institute of Pharmacology of the Polish Academy of Sciences, member of the Polish Academy of Sciences, Polish Academy of Learning and Academia Europaea, and one of the most frequently cited Polish scientists in the field of biomedicine after 1965, president of Polish Neuroscience Society between 2005 and 2007, who in his youth was also an actor of experimental theatre Teatr 38 in Kraków, and episodically a film actor.

== Education ==
In 1962, Przewłocki passed matura in the Bartłomiej Nowodworski High School. Then he studied automation at the Electrical Department of the AGH University of Science and Technology in Kraków (1962–1967) and psychology at the Jagiellonian University (1966–1970).

During his studies he was an actor at Teatr 38, Kraków's experimental theater. He made a theatre debut in 1963 in the performance 23 typescript pages. The performance received the first prize at the Festival of Amateur Poetry Theaters in Poznań, where Julian Przyboś was the chairman of the jury. Later, Przewłocki appeared in plays such as the cowboy-style adaptation of An Ancient Tale in the staging of Mieczysław Święcicki based on the libretto by Aleksander Bandrowski. He played the main roles in the plays directed by Helmut Kajzar: King Richard III in Shakespeare's Richard III and Nathan in The Judges of Stanisław Wyspiański. In addition, he played in the adaptation of Günter Grass's Cat and Mouse directed by Jan Güntner, as well as in Falling and The Book of Job directed by Bogusław Hussakowski.

With the ensemble of Teatr 38 he took part in many theater festivals, performing among others in Nancy and Zagreb, Parma, Erlangen and touring in many Spanish cities. In 1969, he appeared in the short film of Julian Antoniszczak In the Clutches of Sex (W szponach seksu). After many years, he returned to acting – he played the television presenter in the etudes Hydrophobia (2013) and Ad maiorem pastae gloriam (2017) directed by Franciszek Vetulani.

== Career ==
In 1969, Przewłocki started working at the then Department of Pharmacology of the Polish Academy of Sciences, in the Laboratory of Neuropharmacology. There, in 1975, after transforming the department into an independent Institute, he obtained Ph.D. in the field of natural sciences and assumed the position of a senior assistant. In the years 1977–1979 he obtained a Max-Planck scholarship and completed a post-doctoral internship at the Max Planck Institute of Psychiatry in Munich. He obtained his habilitation in neuropharmacology in 1986 at the Nencki Institute of Experimental Biology in Warsaw. The following year he completed a scientific internship at the Institute of Mental Health in Ann Arbor, Michigan. In 1992 he received the title of professor of medical sciences. In the years 1995–1996 he was a scholarship holder of the Fulbright Foundation at the Scripps Research Institute in San Diego. From 1986 he is a member of the Scientific Council of the Institute of Pharmacology of the Polish Academy of Sciences. He was one of the organizers of the Institute of Molecular and Cell Biology at UNESCO/PAN, where he was a professor (1996–1998) and a member of the International Advisory Committee (1998–2008).

In the years 1989–1993 he was the Head of the Neuropeptide Research Department at the Institute of Pharmacology of the Polish Academy of Sciences and from 1993 to 2017 the Head of the Department of Molecular Neuropharmacology. From 1999 he was a professor at the Department of Neurobiology and Neuropsychology at the Institute of Applied Psychology at the Jagiellonian University, from 2004 he was the Head of this department. He published over 200 original research works (among others in Science and Nature) and dozens of reviews and popular science works.

From 2005 he was a member of the IBRO Central and Eastern European Regional Committee, and from 2008 to 2013 the chairman of this organization. In 2013–2016 he was elected and was chairman of the FENS/IBRO Schools organization. He is a member of the Polish Society for the Study of the Nervous System, and in 2005–2007 he was its president. He is a member of the Committee of the Neurobiology of the Polish Academy of Sciences, in the years 1998–2001 he was the vice-chairman of this committee. In the years 2008–2013 he was a member of the National Committee for Cooperation with the International Council of Sciences at the Presidium of the Polish Academy of Sciences. In 2005 he was elected a correspondent member of the Medical Faculty of the Polish Academy of Learning and in 2018 he became a full member. Since 2007, he has been an honorary member of the Polish Society for the Study of Pain. He is a member of international scientific societies (including IASP, EFIC, FENS, SFN, INRC). In 2019 he was elected a correspondent member of the Polish Academy of Sciences.

He was a member of the editorial committee of the journal Life Science (1990–2006), he is currently a member of the editorial committee of the European Journal of Pharmacology (from 2004) and Addiction Biology (since 2009).

== Personal life ==
Przewłocki is married to Barbara Przewłocka, a neuropharmacologist, professor of medical sciences at the Institute of Pharmacology of the Polish Academy of Sciences and a correspondent member of the Polish Academy of Learning. He has two sons.

== Selected papers ==
- PRZEWŁOCKI R. Lasoń W., Konecka A., Gramsch C., Herz A., Reid L.: The opioid peptides dynorphin, circadian rhythms and starvation. Science 1983, 219, 71–72.
- Stein C., Hassan A.H.S., PRZEWŁOCKI R., Gramsch C., Peter K., Herz A.: Opioids from immunocytes interact with receptors on sensory nerves to inhibit nociception in inflammation. Proc Natl Acad Sci USA 1990, 87, 5935–5939.
- Przewlocka B., Lasoń, PRZEWŁOCKI R.: Time-dependent changes in the activity of opioid systems in the spinal cord of monoarthritic rats: a release and in situ hybridization study. Neuroscience 1992 46:209-216.
- PRZEWŁOCKI R., Hassan A.H.S., Lasoń W., Epplen C., Herz A., Stein G.: Gene expression and localization of opioid peptides in immune cells of inflamed tissue: functional role in antinociception. Neuroscience 1992 48:491-500.
- PRZEWŁOCKI R., Parsons K.L., Sweeney D.D., Trotter C., Netzeband J.G., Siggins G.R., Gruol D.L.: Opioid enhancement of calcium oscillations and burst events involving NMDA receptors and L-type calcium channels in cultured hippocampal neurons. J Neurosci., 1999, 19(22):9705-15.
- Schneider T, PRZEWŁOCKI R. Behavioral alterations in rats prenatally exposed to valproic acid: animal model of autism. Neuropsychopharmacology. 2005; 30(1):80-9.
- Ziolkowska B, Gieryk A, Bilecki W, Wawrzczak-Bargiela A, Wedzony K, Chocyk A, Danielson PE, Thomas EA, Hilbush BS, Sutcliffe JG, PRZEWŁOCKI R.: Regulation of α-synuclein gene expression in limbic and motor brain regions of morphine-treated mice. J. Neurosci., 2005, 25, 4996–5003.
- Obara I., Rodriguez Parkitna J., Korostyński M., Makuch W., Kamińska D., Przewłocka B., PRZEWŁOCKI R.: Local peripheral opioid effects and expression of opioid genes in the spinal cord and dorsal root ganglia in neuropathic and inflammatory pain. Pain, 2009 Feb;141(3):283-91.
- Piechota M, Korostynski M, Solecki W, Gieryk A, Slezak M, Bilecki W, Ziolkowska B, Kostrzewa E, Cymerman I, Swiech L, Jaworski J, PRZEWLOCKI R.: "The dissection of transcriptional modules regulated by various drugs of abuse in the mouse striatum.”; Genome Biology, 2010 May 4;11(5):R48.
- Attwood BK, Bourgognon JM, Patel S, Mucha M, Schiavon E, Skrzypiec AE, Young KW, Shiosaka S, Korostynski M, Piechota M, PRZEWLOCKI R, Pawlak R.: Neuropsin cleaves EphB2 in the amygdala to control anxiety. Nature. 2011 May 19;473(7347):372-5.
- Parkitna JR, Sikora M, Gołda S, Gołembiowska K, Bystrowska B, Engblom D, Bilbao A, PRZEWŁOCKI R. Novelty-seeking behaviors and the escalation of alcohol drinking after abstinence in mice are controlled by metabotropic glutamate receptor 5 on neurons expressing dopamine D1 receptors. Biological Psychiatry. 2013 Feb 1;73(3):263-70.
- Skupio U, Sikora M, Korostynski M, Wawrzczak-Bargieła A, Piechota M, Ficek J, PRZEWŁOCKI R. Behavioral and transcriptional patterns of protracted opioid self-administration in mice. Addiction Biology, 2017 Nov;22(6):1802-1816.

== Awards ==
- 1975: The Award of the Scientific Secretary of the Polish Academy of Sciences
- 1986: H. and J. Supniewscy Foundation Award
- 1993: The Award of the Secretary of the Faculty of Medical Sciences of the Polish Academy of Sciences
- 1994: Gold Cross of Merit
- 1998: T. Borowicz Award of the Faculty of Medical Sciences of the Polish Academy of Sciences
- 2000: Medal Medicina Cracoviensis, Diploma and Medal of Collegium Medicum of the Jagiellonian University
- 2004: Knight's Cross of the Order of Polonia Restituta
- 2006: Jędrzej Śniadecki Scientific Award of the Faculty of Medical Sciences of the Polish Academy of Sciences
- 2008: collective award in the Jakub Karol Parnas Competition for the best experimental work in the field of biochemistry and biology
- 2009: Jagiellonian University Rector Award – laureate of the first prize for research at the Faculty of Management and Social Communication
- 2017: Jędrzej Śniadecki Medal for outstanding scientific achievements in the field of medicine and neuropharmacology as well as activities in the field of science organization and a recognized position in the Polish and international scientific community
