= Medical University of Łódź =

Medical school in Łódź, Poland

Coordinates: 51°46′11″N 19°27′14″E

- Uniwersytet Medyczny w Łodzi
- Latin: Universitas Medica Lodzensis
- Established: October 1, 2002; 23 years ago
- Affiliations: Campus Europae, ERASMUS/SOCRATES
- Rector: prof. dr hab. n. med. Janusz Piekarski
- Students: 9,345 (12.2023)
- Location: al. Kościuszki 4, 90-419, Łódź, Poland
- Website: en.umed.pl

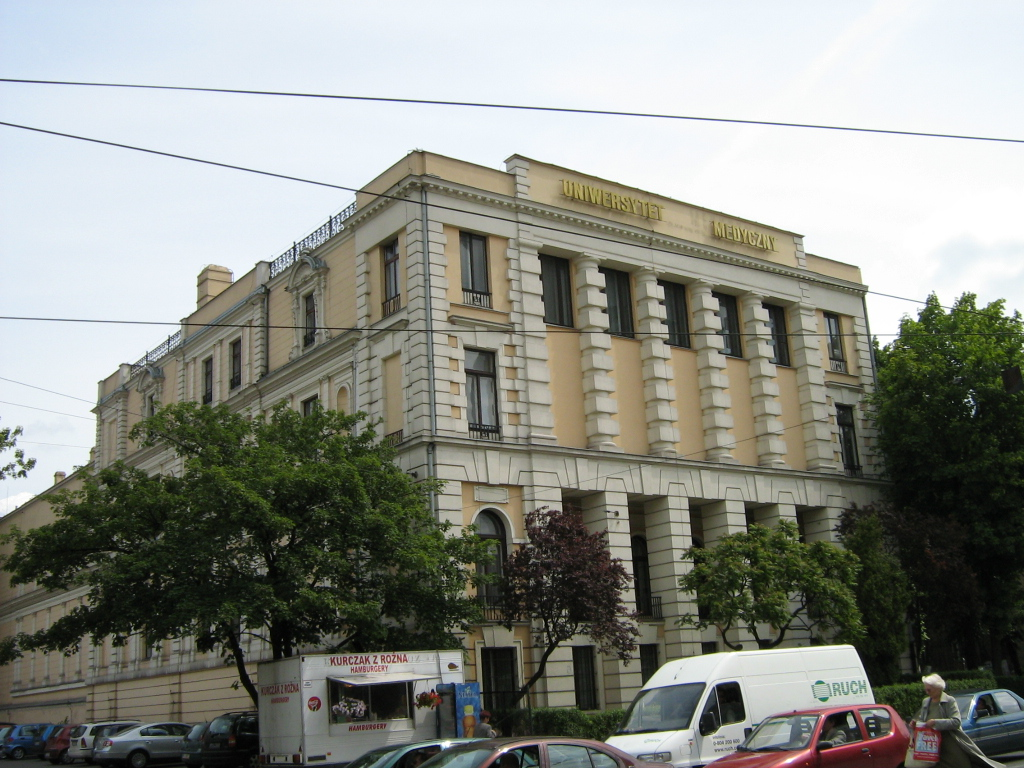
Medical University of Łódź

The Medical University of Łódź (Polish: Uniwersytet Medyczny w Łodzi) was founded on October 1, 2002 in Łódź, Poland, as a merger of the Medical Academy of Łódź (Akademia Medyczna w Łodzi; founded January 1, 1950) and the Military Medical Academy of Łódź (Wojskowa Akademia Medyczna; founded July 1, 1958). It is the largest teaching hospital unit in Poland and a European research center.

== Structure ==
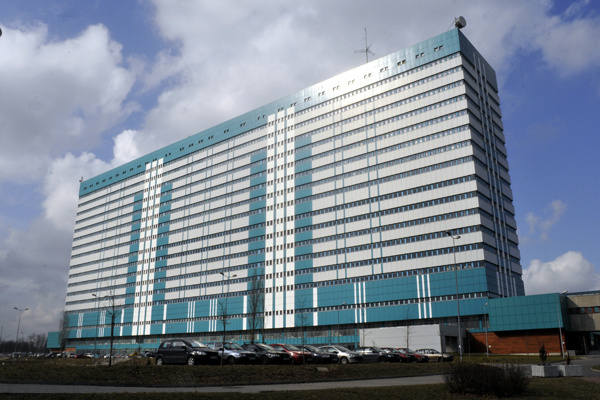
The Clinical and Didactical Center No 4 on Czechoslowacka Street.

It comprises

- 6 research institutes,
- 49 chairs,
- 7 fully equipped university teaching hospitals with a total capacity of 2900 beds, as well as
- 438,000 specialist consultations every year in specialist outpatient clinics, in addition to the
- collaboration with 22 international universities.

== Aspect ==
At the Medical University of Łódź, students are instructed from a 250 plus Basic Science and Clinical Medicine Faculty, composed of physicians, teachers and researchers. Most faculty members of the university hold a dual MD/PhD degree, and all are board certified in their respective specialties.

The Medical University is the biggest state medical university in Poland implementing the following basic tasks:

- educating students in medicine, dentistry, pharmacy and medicine-allied disciplines;
- educating research staff and conducting research work;
- conducting postgraduate training of highly qualified health care system staff;
- participating in health care programs set by the social health care system.

The university made an important evolution of a unique system, based on the availability -during posted office hours- of all professors for individual consultations with students in their offices. This helps promote better interaction between students and faculty as opposed to the previous Soviet style system.

== University teaching activity ==
The curriculum has been focused on preparing specialists for work in various communities and national health care systems. It has been adjusted to requirements laid down in the European Union resolutions validated by our Government. Following the entry of Poland into the European Union on May 1, 2004, the university offers a chance of an automatic recognition of the Diploma of most of the faculties within all 25 countries of the European Union. Currently, over 8000 Polish Students are getting their education within medical and medicine-related areas at various faculties. Medical teaching in English was initiated in 2003/2004. Presently over 300 foreign students from various countries, primarily Saudi Arabia, but also the People's Republic of China, Iran, Republic of China (Taiwan), Kenya, India, Sri Lanka, Canada, Nigeria, Sweden, Norway attend medical and dental courses. The quality of the medical curriculum is comparable with other Polish universities, and subject to regular official inspections and rankings. In previous years, a few select students of the Faculty of Medicine have been the recipients of scientific awards like "Medical Laurels" of Polish Academy of Science or "Primus Inter Pares" - Best Student of the Polish Republic in the Lodz Region.

== Science and research ==
Medical University of Lodz is one of the major medical research centers in Poland. In one academic year over a hundred research grants are awarded, as well as numerous research contracts. At present substantial number of individual research projects are being conducted. Medical University of Lodz has been carrying extensive international scientific cooperation with such foreign academic and research centers as:

- The Catholic University in Nijmegen, Netherlands
- Duke University Medical Center, Durham, North Carolina, United States
- University of Toronto Humboldt Universitat, Berlin, Germany
- Friedrich-Alexander Universitat, Erlangen, Germany
- King's College London, UK
- Universite degli Studi di Milano, Italy
- The Human Craniofacial Institute in Dallas, United States
- The Howard Hughes Medical Center, United States
- The university in Bielefeld, Germany
- Universite Claude Bernard, Lyon, France
- University of Kuopio, Finland
- Friedrich-Alexander Universitat Erlangen, Germany

The majority of university chairs, clinics and departments directly co-operate with foreign centers through staff Exchange programs.

== Clinical activity ==
At present, Medical University has over 1600 hospital beds in Teaching Hospitals that provide medical services for patients, being the essential base for research work and undergraduate and postgraduate teaching. University Teaching Hospitals and University-affiliated department constitute a basic source for highly specialized diagnostic and treatment services provided by professors, associate professors and specialists of various medical disciplines who take care of health needs of the Lodz region community and promote health-related programs.

== Students' academic activities ==
Students of the Medical University take part in ERASMUS – European international academic Exchange program. Within last few years there were almost 25 incoming students from France, Portugal, Spain and other parts of Europe and over 100 outgoing students in the frame of this exchange program. Students' Scientific Society has been involved in active popularization of research work among students, organization of scientific conferences and co-ordination of Students' Scientific Groups

== Faculties ==
University had merged its faculties into three larger, list of faculties before merging:

- Faculty of Medicine
- Faculty of Medicine and Dentistry
- Faculty of Pharmacy
- Faculty of Physiotherapy
- Faculty of Nursing and Midwifery
- Faculty of Health Sciences
- Faculty of Military Medicine

And after merging:

- Faculty of Medicine with Department of Dentistry and Department of Biomedical Sciences
- Faculty of Pharmacy
- Faculty of Health Sciences with Department of Nursery and Midwifery

== Subjects ==
Medical University realise mostly Polish-language subjects/fields of studies:

- Medicine
- Military Medicine (together with Military University of Land Forces)
- Dentistry
- Biotechnology
- Electroradiology
- Pharmacy
- Cosmetology
- Medical Analytics
- Physiotherapy
- Nursery
- Midwifery
- Public Health
- Emergency Medical Services
- Dental Techniques
- Dietetics
