= Mirosław Mossakowski =

Polish neurologist and neuropathologist (1929–2001)

- Born: 23 September 1929; Byaroza
- Died: 26 December 2001 (aged 72)
- Citizenship: Polish
- Occupations: Neurologist, neuropathologist

Mirosław Jan Mossakowski (23 September 1929 – 26 December 2001) was a neurologist, neuropathologist, president of the Polish Academy of Sciences from 1999 until 2001, co-founder and president of the Polish Neuroscience Society.

== Biography ==
In 1953 Mossakowski graduated from the Medical School in Gdańsk. He studied for a Ph.D. at the Department of Histopathology of the Central Nervous System of the Polish Academy of Sciences. His supervisor was Adam Opalski.

In 1953 he joined the Polish United Workers' Party. He became a neurologist at the Neurological Clinic of the Medical School, where he undertook further training under Irena Hausmanowa-Petrusewicz In 1959 he trained at the Montreal Neurological Institute under Wilder Penfield. In 1960 he was awarded a PhD by the Warsaw Medical School for his thesis titled Astrocytomas of cerebrum and cerebellum.

In the years 1966–1967 he visited the National Institute of Neurological Disorders and Stroke in Bethesda, in the laboratory of Igor Klatzo. In 1973 he became a correspondent member, and in 1986 became a full member of the Polish Academy of Sciences.

He was part of the Association of Polish Neuropathologists, the Polish Neuroscience Society (President from 1991 until 1992 and from 1997 until 1999), and the Polish Society of Cytochemistry and Histochemistry. He was also a two-term vice-president of the International Society of Neuropathology. He was a member of the editorial boards of Acta Neurobiologiae Experimentalis and Clinical Neuropathology. He supervised nine doctoral dissertations.

He was married to Bibiana Mossakowska. He had a son Paweł Mossakowski.

He was buried at the Powązki Cemetery. The Mossakowski Medical Research Institute Polish Academy of Sciences (MMRI PAS) is named after him.

== Books ==
- Podstawy neuropatologii. 1981.
- Guzy układu nerwowego. Zakład Narodowy im. Ossolińskich. 1997. ISBN 83-04-04366-1.

== Distinctions ==
- Knight's Cross of the Order of Polonia Restituta
- Officer's Cross of the Order of Polonia Restituta
- Commander's Cross of the Order of Polonia Restituta
- Medal of the 30th Anniversary of People's Poland
- Medal of the 40th Anniversary of People's Poland
- Order of Friendship (2001)

== Bibliography ==
- Albrecht, Jan (2003). "Profesor Mirosław Mossakowski: neurobiolog – intuicjonista i wizjoner – Wspomnienie". Postępy Biologii Komórki. 30 (1).
