= External capsule =

White matter structure of the brain

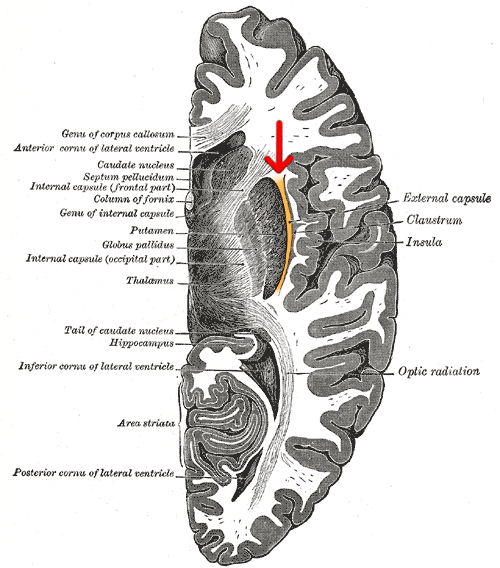
- Horizontal section of right cerebral hemisphere. (external capsule shown in orange, indicated by red arrow.)

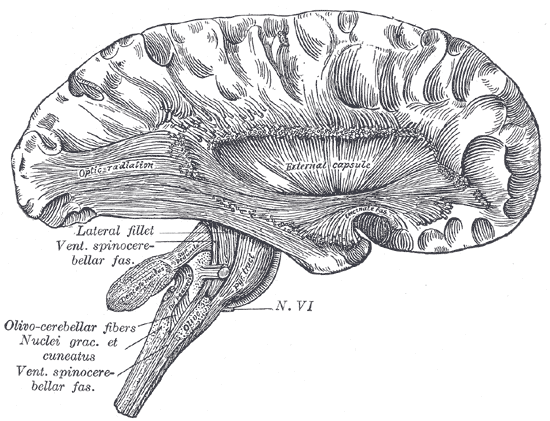
- Deep dissection of cortex and brain-stem. (External capsule visible at center.)

Details

Identifiers
- Latin: capsula externa
- MeSH: D066271
- NeuroNames: 253
- NeuroLex ID: nlx_16247
- TA98: A14.1.09.551
- TA2: 5588
- FMA: 61959

The external capsule is a series of white matter fiber tracts in the brain. These fibers run between the most lateral (toward the side of the head) segment of the lentiform nucleus (more specifically the putamen) and the claustrum.

The white matter of the external capsule contains fibers known as corticocortical association fibers. These fibers are responsible for connecting the cerebral cortex to another cortical area. The capsule itself appears as a thin white sheet of white matter.

The external capsule is a route for cholinergic fibers from the basal forebrain to the cerebral cortex.

The putamen separates the external capsule from the internal capsule medially and the claustrum separates it from the extreme capsule laterally. But the external capsule eventually joins the internal capsule around the lentiform nucleus.

== Additional images ==
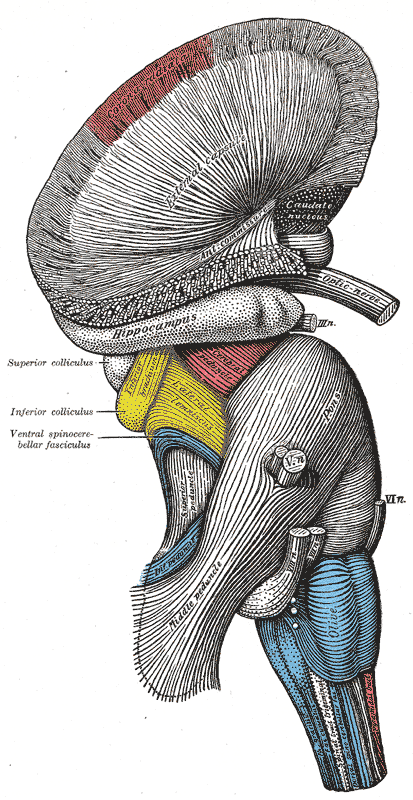
Superficial dissection of brain-stem. Lateral view.

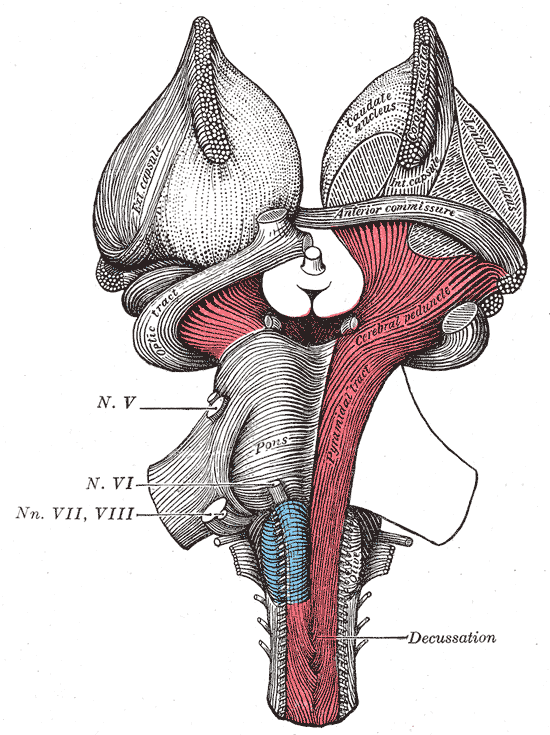
Superficial dissection of brain-stem. Ventral view.

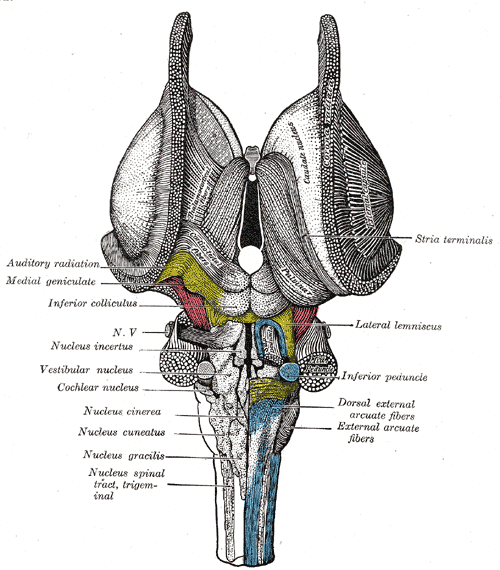
Dissection of brain-stem. Dorsal view.

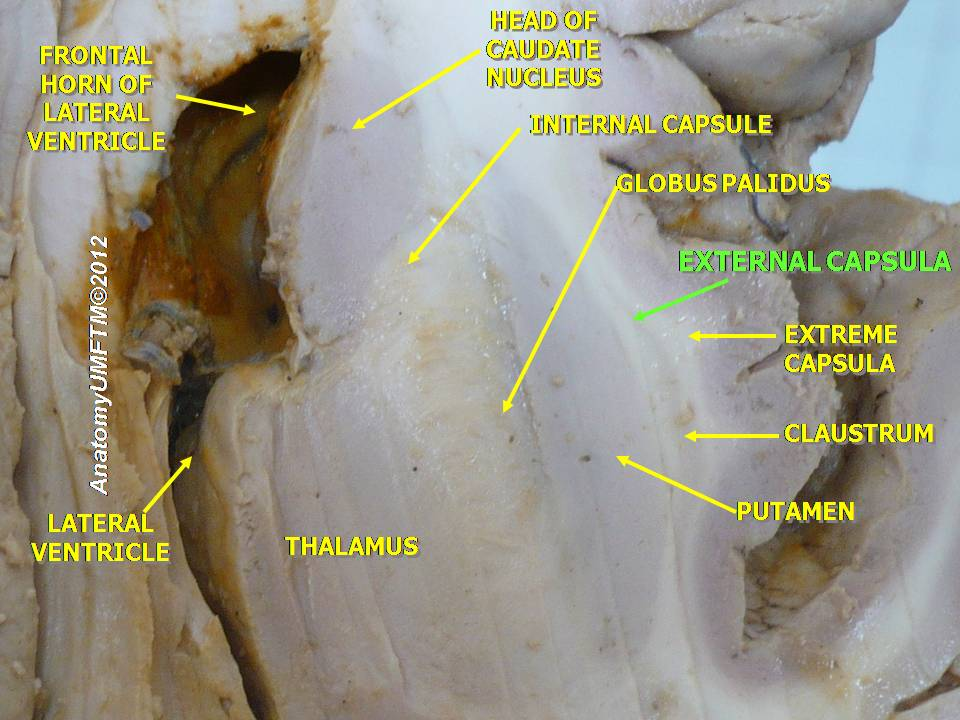
External capsule

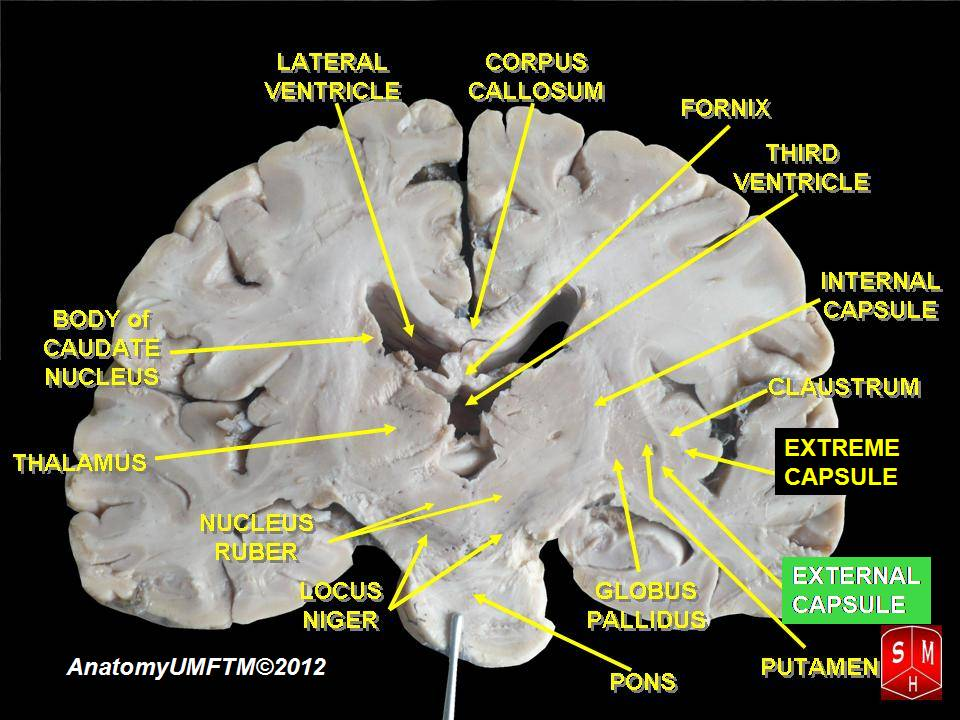
External capsule

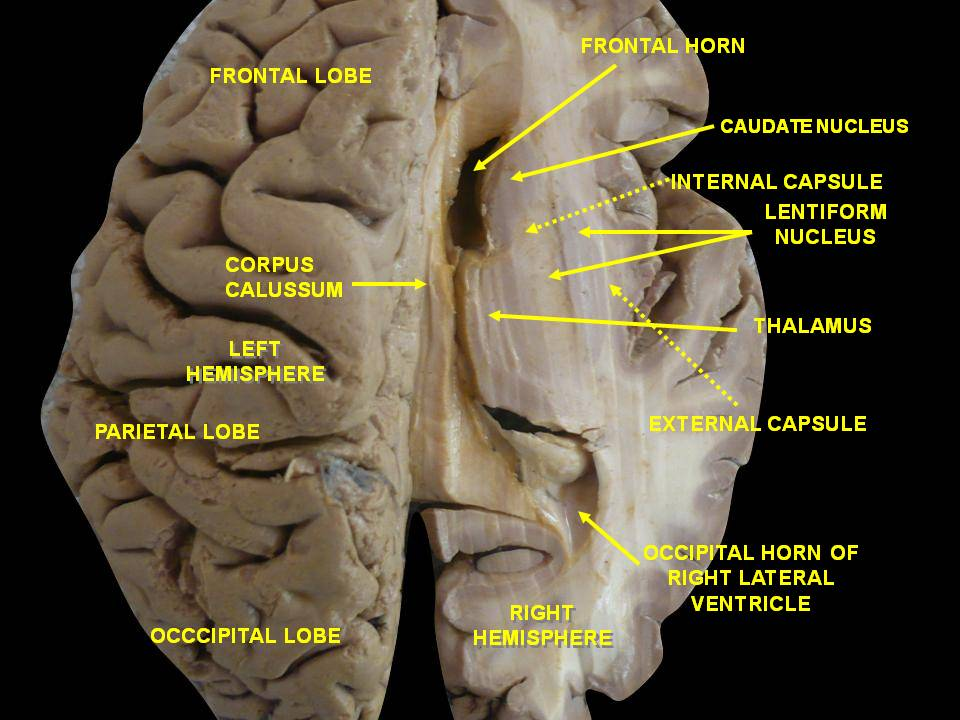
Ventricles of brain and basal ganglia. Superior view. Horizontal section. Deep dissection.

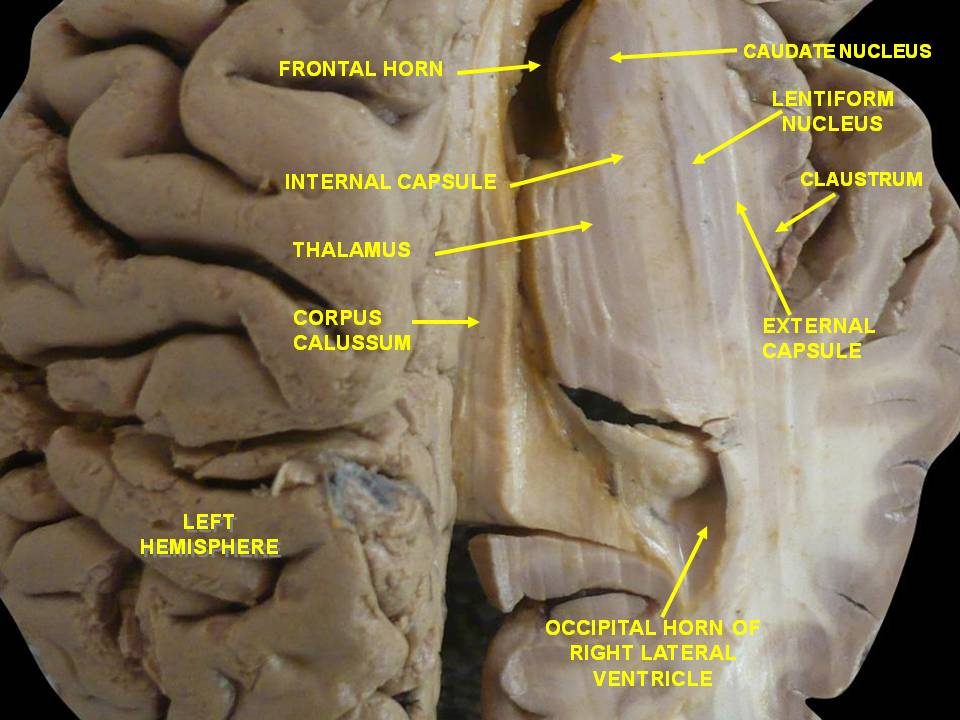
Ventricles of brain and basal ganglia.Superior view. Horizontal section. Deep dissection.
