= Acta Neurobiologiae Experimentalis =

- Discipline: Neuroscience
- Language: English
- Edited by: Katarzyna Łukasiuk

Publication details
- Former name(s): Acta Biologiae Experimentalis
- History: 1928–present
- Publisher: Nencki Institute of Experimental Biology (Poland)
- Frequency: Quarterly
- Impact factor: 1.269 (2021)

Standard abbreviations
- ISO 4: Acta Neurobiol. Exp.

Indexing
- CODEN: ANEXAC
- ISSN: 0065-1400 (print); 1689-0035 (web)
- LCCN: 71648543
- OCLC no.: 888551609

Links
- Journal homepage; Online archive

Acta Neurobiologiae Experimentalis is a quarterly peer-reviewed scientific journal covering all aspects of neuroscience. It was established in 1928 as Acta Biologiae Experimentalis, covering all of biology. It obtained its current name when the scope was focused on neuroscience in 1970, when Jerzy Konorski became editor-in-chief. The current editor-in-chief is Katarzyna Łukasiuk (Nencki Institute of Experimental Biology). The journal is published by the Nencki Institute of Experimental Biology.

== Abstracting and indexing ==
The journal is abstracted and indexed in BIOSIS Previews, Current Contents/Life Sciences, Index Medicus/MEDLINE/PubMed, Biological Abstracts, Science Citation Index Expanded, Embase/Excerpta Medica, and Cambridge Scientific Abstracts. According to the Journal Citation Reports, the journal has a 2021 impact factor of 1.269.
