= Opalski cells =

Cell found in the brain

An Opalski cell is a large (up to 35 μm in diameter) altered glial cell, originated from degenerating astrocytes. They are characterized by small, eccentric, pyknotic, densely staining nuclei (single or multiple) displaced to the periphery, and fine granular cytoplasm. Opalski cells are typically found in the cortical and subcortical regions (basal ganglia and thalamus) of the brains of individuals with Wilson disease and acquired hepatocerebral degeneration. Opalski cells were first described by Polish neurologist and neuropathologist Adam Opalski in 1930.

== Appearance ==
The ultrastructural features of Opalski cells have a reduced organelle. These reduced organelles include a low number of mitochondria, a not so thick endoplasmic reticulum, and reduced Golgi apparatus. These show the degenerative state of Opalski cells when compared with regular cells.

== Location in the brain ==
In another study, the authors inspect autopsy brain tissues which contain Wilson's disease with three types of abnormal cells. The three abnormal cells that were in the study were Alzheimer's type 1, Alzheimer's type 2, and Opalski cells. As the authors examined which of the three abnormal cells would have more progression in damaging the selected regions of the brain. An abundant amount of Alzheimer's type 2 in the putamen area while Alzheimer's type 1 had the least abundant in comparison. Opalski cells mostly preferred the putamen area of the brain. This shows the where Opalski cells are located in Wilson's disease, and how Opalski cells have a degenerative response in copper toxicity.

== History ==
Between 1928 and 1929, Opalski went to Munich for an internship. During this internship he examined altered glial cells occurring in the brain in Wilson's disease. These cells in this disease would then be known as Opalski cells from an out grown giant glial cell. Professors Alzheimer and Spielmayer did not see these cells.

== Wilson's Disease ==
Wilson's disease is a rare autosomal recessive disorder that prevents the body from removing copper out of the body. This leads to the accumulation of copper in the body. The condition is caused by a genetic mutation in the ATP7B gene which is involved in the transport of copper within the human body.

== Pathology ==
Opalski cells from Wilson's disease show no main changes, as seen in the initial reports from S. Wilson. This was seen in a gross examination in which the brain showed no modification. It sometimes appears atrophic in longer lasting cases. An Opalski cell is a larged altered glial cell with small shrunken nucleus.
