= Bogdan Dreher =

Polish-Australian neurophysiologist (1941–2019)

- Citizenship: Polish, Australian
- Education: University of Warsaw
- Occupation: Neurophysiologist

Bogdan Dreher (1941 – 22 May 2019) was a neurophysiologist.

== Biography ==
He was born with a name Daniel. His father Jakub Drajer was shot in 1943 by the Nazis. His mother Regina fled with him to the Soviet Union, where they were sent to a kolkhoz near Yershov. They returned to Poland in 1945. Bogdan Dreher graduated in biology from the University of Warsaw. In he 1962 joined the Department of Neurophysiology at the Nencki Institute, in the laboratory of Bogusław Żernicki. He obtained doctorate in 1968.

In 1969 he declared the will to emigrate to Israel. He was stripped of Polish citizenship and was handed a one‑way travel document. His wife Zofia, also a biologist, and son Jakub joined him in Canberra two years later.

Bogdan Dreher worked at the Department of Anatomy at the University of Sydney until his retirement in 2007. He published 126 full papers, 4 book chapters, 5 biographical papers and over 140 abstracts. His research interests included neurophysiology and neuroanatomy of the visual system of mammals. He collaborated with Wioletta Waleszczyk.

== Accolades ==
- Nencki Award (2013)
