= Liliana Lubińska =

Polish neuroscientist

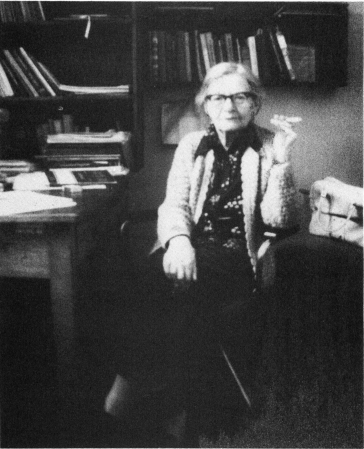
Polish Neuroscientist Liliana Lubińska

Liliana Lubińska (14 October 1904 – 19 November 1990) was a Polish neuroscientist known for her research on the peripheral nervous system and her discovery of bidirectional axoplasmic transport. She and her husband Jerzy Konorski founded the Department of Neurophysiology at the Nencki Institution in 1946

== Early life and education ==
Lubińska was born in Łódź in 1904 and married Jerzy Konorski, a collaborator and fellow neuroscientist. Lubińska entered the University of Warsaw to study biology in 1923, but a year later she transferred to the University of Paris, Sorbonne to continue her study of biological sciences. In 1927, Lubińska she received her B.A. in biological chemistry and physiology, and her doctorate in 1932. While working on her doctorate, she worked in Louis and Marcelle Lapicque's Laboratory of Physiology, investigating chronaxie and reflexes. Her doctoral thesis focused on noniterative reflex, and she ultimately received a prize for her thesis from the Academy of Paris.

== Career and research ==
After finishing her doctorate in Paris, Lubińska began her independent research on the effect of different agents on excitability of neuromuscular preparation and took part in experiments of Jerzy Konorski and Stefan Miller on conditioned reflexes at the Nencki Institute of Experimental Biology in Warsaw. When World War II broke out between 1939 and 1940, she was forced to flee as the institute was destroyed by bombardment. Lubińska and Konorski tried desperately to cross the northern border to eventually join Konorski's brother in England; however, the tight German control caused them to remain in Białystok. Soon, Axis powers occupied the entire eastern part of Poland, including Białystok, forcing the pair to flee to the Caucasus. There, she and her husband collaborated on peripheral nerve regeneration at the Georgian Institute of Experimental Medicine in Sukhumi from 1940 to 1945.

After the war, Lubińska's research continued in the realm of the peripheral nervous system. From 1945 to her retirement in 1982, she studied neural structure and physiology, especially axoplasmic transport, and showed that axoplasmic transport could be bidirectional. In collaboration with Giuseppe Moruzzi and Horace Winchell Magoun, they established that the brain stem contains neurons that condition the brain center's awareness and posture and gave the conscious state control of the physical foundation, which led to the discovery, such a system is active during waking and dreaming. Such contributions by Lubińska led to a further understanding and discoveries in the neuroscience field. Over her career, she published approximately 80 papers and was widely acclaimed as being at the cutting edge of her field.

== Honors and awards ==
- Neuroscience editorial board (1976-1990)
- German Academy of Natural Scientists Leopoldina, foreign member
- International Brain Research Organization, honorary member
- Solange Coemme prize, Académie Nationale de Médecine
- Honorary member, Polish Physiological Society
