= Marietta Tuena =

Mexican physician, professor, biochemist (1935–2023)

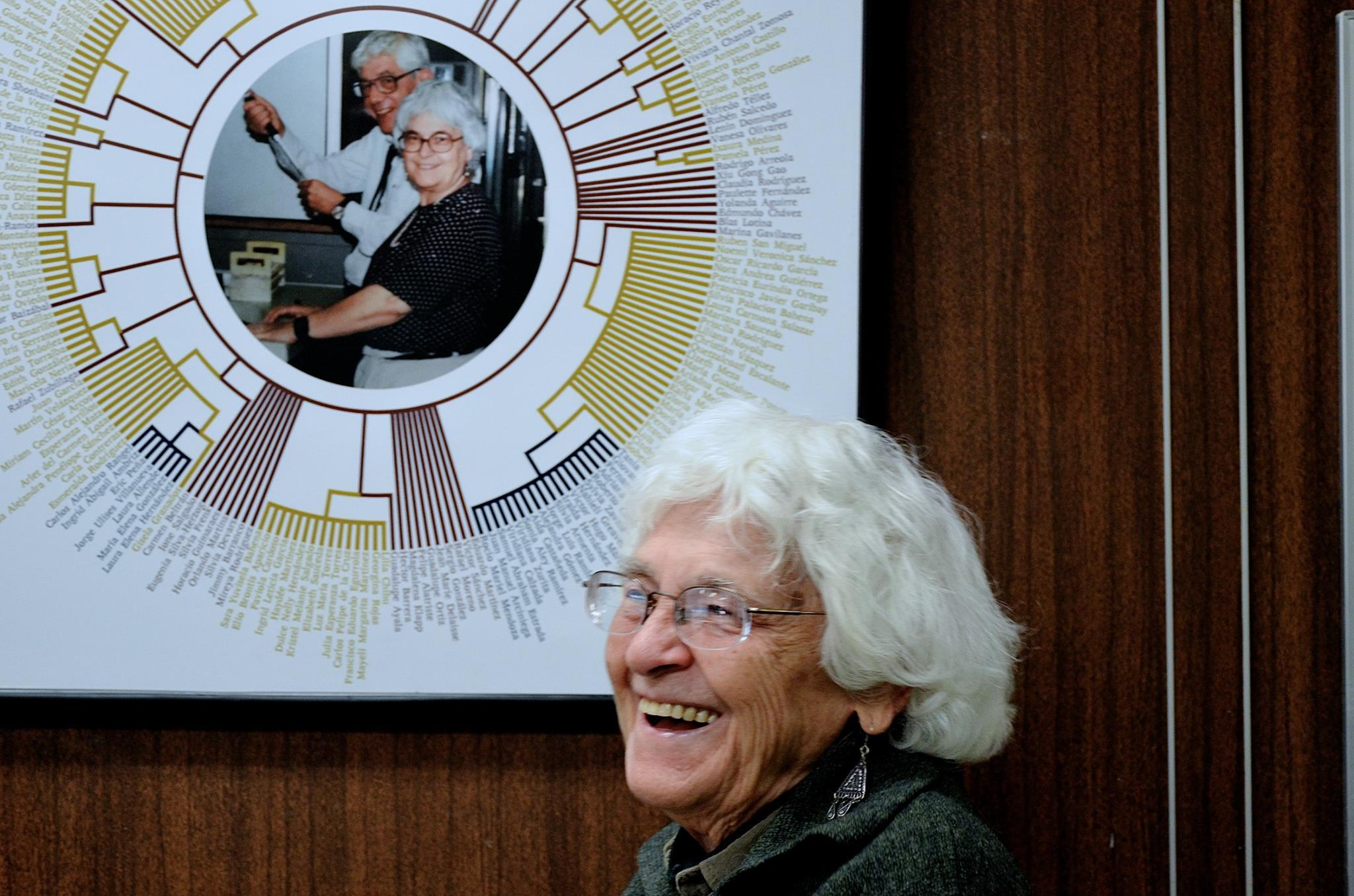
Image of Marietta tuena

Marietta Tuena Sangri (November 12, 1935 – February 3, 2023) was a Mexican physician, professor, biochemist and researcher. She is a member of the National System of Researchers. She worked at the Instituto de Fisiologia Celular as an Emeritus Researcher. A scientist Emeritus is a special designation that is given to distinguished scientists that want to retire but still maintain a working relationship with National Institute of Health.

== Career ==
Tuena attended the National Autonomous University of Mexico and graduated in 1960 with a degree in medicine. She would go on to earn a doctorate in biochemistry from the same university alongside her husband, Armando Gómez Puyou. She was part of an academic group that led to the founding of the Institute of Cellular Physiology at UNAM. She was a professor of biochemistry at the Faculty of Chemical Sciences of the UNAM and the Institute of Neurology. She was head of the Teaching Coordination in the Department of Biochemistry of the Faculty of Medicine of the UNAM, professor at Johns Hopkins University, at the Federal Technical University of Zurich, Switzerland; at the State University of Campinas, Brazil; at the Federal University of Rio de Janeiro, and at the Nencki Institute for Experimental Biology, and at the Arrhenius Laboratory, Stockholm University.

She published more than 150 scientific articles and in 1995 she was named Researcher Emerita of the Institute of Cellular Physiology.

In 1989, she was given the National University Award by her alma mater for her research and accomplishments in the natural sciences.

== Works ==
- de Gómez-Puyou, M. Tuena; Gómez-Puyou, A. (1998). "Enzymes in Low Water Systems". Critical Reviews in Biochemistry and Molecular Biology. 33 (1). Informa UK Limited: 53–89. doi:10.1080/10409239891204170. ISSN 1040-9238. PMID 9543628.
- Perez-Montfort, Ruy; de Gomez-Puyou, Marietta; Gomez-Puyou, Armando (2002-05-01). "The Interfaces of Oligomeric Proteins as Targets for Drug Design against Enzymes from Parasites". Current Topics in Medicinal Chemistry. 2 (5). Bentham Science Publishers Ltd.: 457–470. doi:10.2174/1568026024607454. ISSN 1568-0266. PMID 11966467.
- López-Pérez, Edgar; de Gómez-Puyou, Marietta Tuena; Nuñez, Concepción José; Zapién, Denise Martínez; Guardado, Salomón Alas; Beltrán, Hiram Isaac; Pérez-Hernández, Gerardo (2023). "Ordered-domain unfolding of thermophilic isolated β subunit ATP synthase". Protein Science. 32 (7) e4689. doi:10.1002/pro.4689. ISSN 0961-8368. PMC 10273367. PMID 37252686.
