= Elżbieta Pyza =

Polish biologist

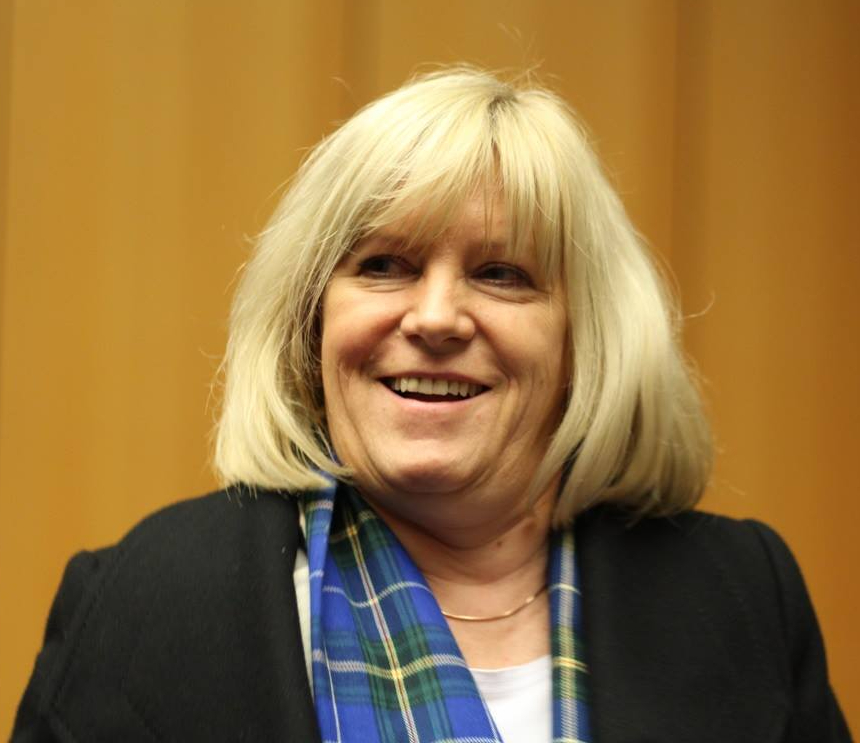
- Elżbieta Pyza, 2014
- Citizenship: Polish
- Occupation: Biologist

Elżbieta Małgorzata Pyza is a biologist, professor of biological sciences, academic teacher at the Institute of Zoology and Biomedical Research of the Jagiellonian University, head of the Department of Cell Biology and Imaging of the Jagiellonian University in the years 2001–2024, active member of the Polish Academy of Arts and Sciences, director of the 4th Department of Natural Sciences of the Polish Academy of Arts and Sciences, president of the Polish Copernicus Society of Naturalists, former president of the Polish Neuroscience Society, popularizer of science.

== Biography ==
In 1981, she completed her master's degree in biology at the Jagiellonian University. In 1990, also at the Jagiellonian University, she obtained a doctorate in natural sciences, in biology, based on her thesis entitled Udział serotoniny w regulacji rytmiki aktywności lokomotorycznej świerszcza domowego (The role of serotonin in the regulation of the rhythmicity of locomotor activity in the house cricket (Acheta domesticus L.)), supervised by Janusz Wojtusiak. In 1998, she obtained her habilitation at the Jagiellonian University based on her thesis entitled Rytmy biologiczne i strukturalna plastyczność w układzie wzrokowym Musca domestica i Drosophila melanogaster (Biological rhythms and structural plasticity in the visual system of Musca domestica and Drosophila melanogaster). In 2003, she was awarded the title of professor of biological sciences.

Her specializations include cell biology, chronobiology, insect physiological ethology, insect neurobiology, and zoology. She has completed seventeen research projects and co-authored nearly eighty original research papers. At the Jagiellonian University, she has lectured on cell biology, neuroethology, the evolution of the nervous system, and developmental biology. She has supervised sixteen Ph.D.s. She is a member of the Committee on Neurobiology of the Polish Academy of Sciences. She was the chair of the Committee on Developmental Biology of the Polish Academy of Arts and Sciences. She is a member of the organizing committee of Brain Week in Kraków and a member of the Council of Ambassadors of the Cogiteon Małopolska Science Center.
