= Adam Opalski =

Polish neurologist and neuropathologist

Adam Opalski (26 November 1897 – 3 November 1963) was a Polish neurologist and neuropathologist.

He was born in Olkusz and described a specific type of characteristically altered glial cells (currently referred to as Opalski cells), developing in the brain in Wilson’s disease. His doctoral students included Mirosław Mossakowski. He died in Warsaw.
