= Irena Nalepa =

Polish neuroscientist (born 1951)

Irena Maria Nalepa
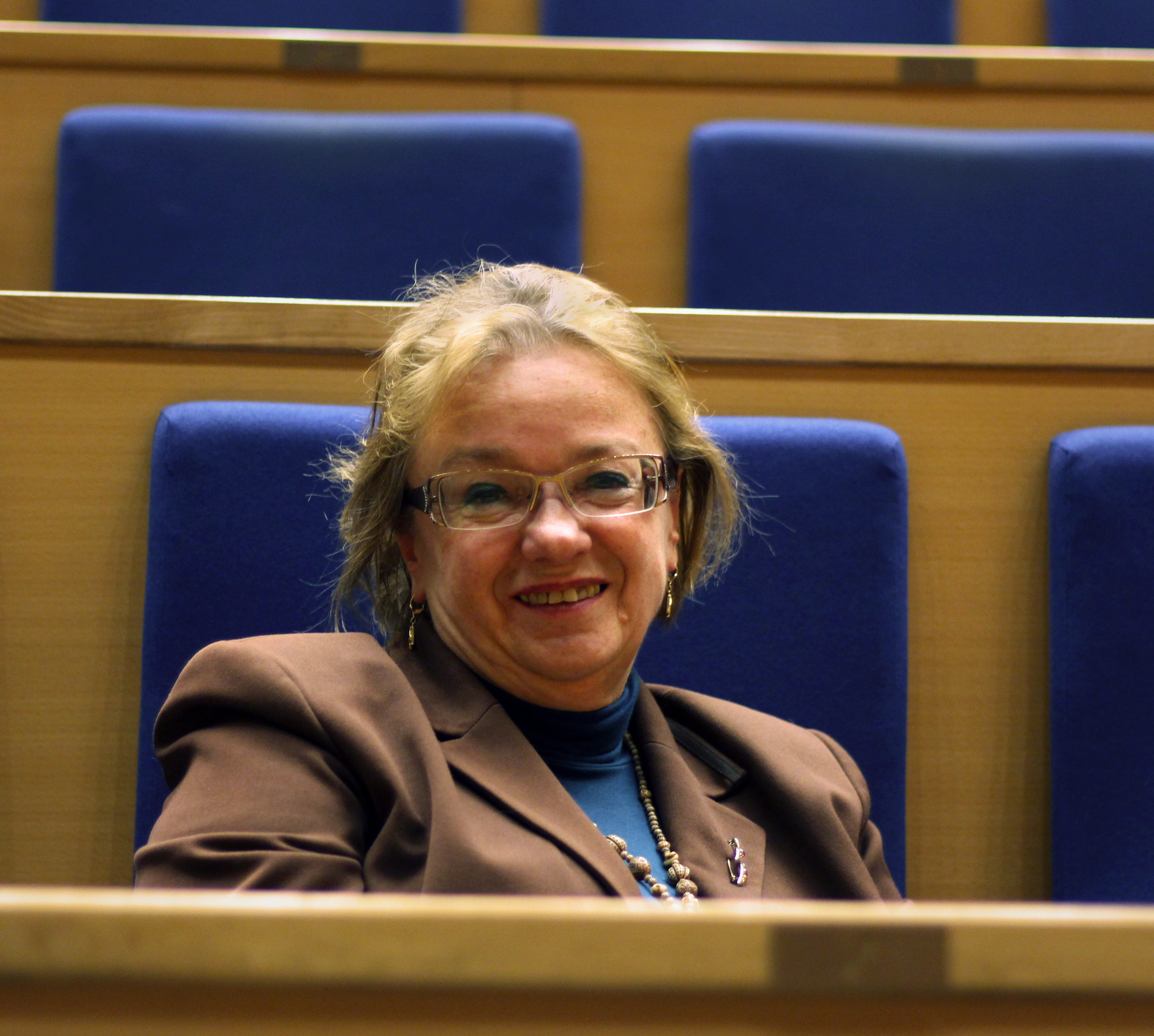
- Born: 24 November 1951 (age 74); Kraków
- Citizenship: Polish
- Occupations: neuroscientist pharmacologist biochemist

Irena Maria Nalepa (Polish pronunciation: [iˈrɛ.na ma.rja naˈlɛ.pa]; born 24 November 1951) is a Polish neuroscientist, pharmacologist and biochemist, professor of medical sciences and professor at the Institute of Pharmacology of the Polish Academy of Sciences.

== Biography ==
She graduated from the Jagiellonian University and received her PhD in 1980. Since 2004 she has the title of full professor.

Currently she is a professor, Head of Department of Brain Biochemistry and vice-chairman of the Institute of Pharmacology of Polish Academy of Sciences, a chairwoman of Scientific Council of popular-science magazine Wszechświat and member of Neuroscience Committee of Polish Academy of Sciences. She was the president of the Polish Neuroscience Society between 2023 and 2025.

She supervised six doctoral dissertations.
