= Polish Neuroscience Society =

Scientific association

- Formation: 1991
- Leader: Jacek Jaworski
- Website: ptbun.org.pl

Polish Neuroscience Society (Polish: Polskie Towarzystwo Badań Układu Nerwowego) is an association of neuroscientists in Warsaw established in 1991.

== Presidents ==
- Mirosław Mossakowski (1991–1992)
- Małgorzata Kossut (1992–1995)
- Andrzej Wróbel (1995–1997)
- Mirosław Mossakowski (1997–1999)
- Jerzy Vetulani (1999–2001)
- Małgorzata Kossut (2001–2003)
- Katarzyna Nałęcz (2003–2005)
- Ryszard Przewłocki (2005–2007)
- Jolanta Skangiel-Kramska (2007–2009)
- Julita Czarkowska-Bauch (2009–2011)
- Marian H. Lewandowski (2011–2013)
- Andrzej Szutowicz (2013–2015)
- Małgorzata Skup (2015–2017)
- Jan Celichowski (2017–2019)
- Grzegorz Hess (2019–2021)
- Elżbieta Pyza (2021–2023)
- Irena Nalepa (2023–2025)
- Jacek Jaworski

Source.
