= Grandmother cell =

Hypothetical neuron that responds to a single concept

The grandmother cell, sometimes called the "Jennifer Aniston neuron", is a hypothetical neuron that represents a complex but specific concept or object. It activates when a person "sees, hears, or otherwise sensibly discriminates" a specific entity, such as their grandmother. It contrasts with the concept of ensemble coding (or "coarse" coding), where the unique set of features characterizing the grandmother is detected as a particular activation pattern across an ensemble of neurons, rather than being detected by a specific "grandmother cell".

The term was coined around 1969 by cognitive scientist Jerry Lettvin. Rather than serving as a serious hypothesis, the "grandmother cell" concept was initially largely used in jokes and came to be used as a "straw man" or "foil" for a discussion of ensemble theories in introductory textbooks. However, a similar concept, that of the gnostic neuron, was introduced several years earlier by Jerzy Konorski as a serious proposal.

== History ==
In 1953, Horace Barlow described cells in a frog retina as "bug detectors", but the term did not gain wide usage. Several years later, Jerome (Jerry) Lettvin and others also studied these and other cells, eventually resulting in their widely known 1959 paper "What the frog’s eye tells the frog’s brain."

Around 1969, Lettvin introduced the term "grandmother cell" in a course he was teaching at MIT, telling a fictitious anecdote about a neurosurgeon who had discovered a group of "mother cells" in the brain that "responded uniquely only to a mother... whether animate or stuffed, seen from before or behind, upside down or on a diagonal or offered by caricature, photograph or abstraction". In Lettvin's story, the neurosurgeon went on to remove (ablate) all these "several thousand separate neurons" from the brain of Portnoy, the title character of Philip Roth's 1969 novel Portnoy's Complaint, thus curing him from his obsession with his mother, and went on to study "grandmother cells" instead.

By 2005, Ed Connor observed that the term had "become a shorthand for invoking all of the overwhelming practical arguments against a one-to-one object coding scheme. No one wants to be accused of believing in grandmother cells." However, in that year UCLA neurosurgeons Itzhak Fried, mentee Rodrigo Quian Quiroga and others published findings on what they would come to call the "Jennifer Aniston neuron". After operating on patients who experience epileptic seizures, the researchers showed photos of celebrities like Jennifer Aniston. The patients, who were fully conscious, often had a particular neuron fire, suggesting that the brain has Aniston-specific neurons.

== Support ==
=== Face selective cells ===
Visual neurons in the inferior temporal cortex of the monkey fire selectively to hands and faces. These cells are selective in that they do not fire for other visual objects important for monkeys such as fruit and genitalia. Research finds that some of these cells can be trained to show high specificity for arbitrary visual objects, and these would seem to fit the requirements of gnostic/grandmother cells. In addition, evidence exists for cells in the human hippocampus that have highly selective responses to different categories of stimuli including highly selective responses to individual human faces.

However most of the reported face-selective cells are not grandmother/gnostic cells since they do not represent a specific percept, that is, they are not cells narrowly selective in their activations for one face and only one face irrespective of transformations of size, orientation, and color. Even the most selective face cells usually also discharge, if more weakly, to a variety of individual faces. Furthermore, face-selective cells often vary in their responsiveness to different aspects of faces. This suggests that cell responsiveness arises from the need of a monkey to differentiate among different individual faces rather than among other categories of stimuli such as bananas with their discrimination properties linked to the fact that different individual faces are much more similar to each other in their overall organization and fine detail than other kinds of stimuli. Moreover, it has been suggested that these cells might in fact be responding as specialized feature detector neurons that only function in the holistic context of a face construct.

One idea has been that such cells form ensembles for the coarse or distributed coding of faces rather than detectors for specific faces. Thus, a specific grandmother may be represented by a specialized ensemble of grandmother or near grandmother cells.

=== Individual specific recognition cells ===
In 2005, a UCLA and Caltech study found evidence of different cells that fire in response to particular people, such as Bill Clinton or Jennifer Aniston. A neuron for Halle Berry, for example, might respond "to the concept, the abstract entity, of Halle Berry", and would fire not only for images of Halle Berry, but also to the actual name "Halle Berry". However, there is no suggestion in that study that only the cell being monitored responded to that concept, nor was it suggested that no other actress would cause that cell to respond (although several other presented images of actresses did not cause it to respond). The researchers believe that they have found evidence for sparseness, rather than for grandmother cells.

Further evidence for the theory that a small neural network provides facial recognition was found from analysis of cell recording studies of macaque monkeys. By formatting faces as points in a high-dimensional linear space, the scientists discovered that each face cell’s firing rate is proportional to the projection of an incoming face stimulus onto a single axis in this space, allowing a face cell ensemble of about 200 cells to encode the location of any face in the space.

== Sparseness vs distributed representations ==
The grandmother cell hypothesis is an extreme version of the idea of sparseness, and is not without critics. The opposite of the grandmother cell theory is the distributed representation theory, that states that a specific stimulus is coded by its unique pattern of activity over a large group of neurons widely distributed in the brain.

The arguments against the sparseness include:

1. According to some theories, one would need thousands of cells for each face, as any given face must be recognised from many different angles – profile, 3/4 view, full frontal, from above, etc.
2. Rather than becoming more and more specific as visual processing proceeds from retina through the different visual centres of the brain, the image is partially dissected into basic features such as vertical lines, colour, speed, etc., distributed in various modules separated by relatively large distances. How all these disparate features are re-integrated to form a seamless whole is known as the binding problem.

== Pontifical cells ==
William James in 1890 proposed a related idea of a pontifical cell. The pontifical cell is defined as a putative, and implausible cell which had all our experiences. This is different from a concept specific cell in that it is the site of experience of sense data. James's 1890 pontifical cell was instead a cell "to which the rest of the brain provided a representation" of a grandmother. The experience of grandmother occurred in this cell.
