= Małgorzata Skup =

Polish biochemist

- Citizenship: Polish
- Education: University of Warsaw
- Occupation: biochemist

Małgorzata Hanna Skup is a biochemist, professor of biological sciences, in 2014–2018 head of the Department of Neurophysiology at the Nencki Institute of Experimental Biology of the Polish Academy of Sciences, in 2015–2017 president of the Polish Neuroscience Society, “researcher of molecular and cellular mechanisms of reparative plasticity in the damaged brain and spinal cord”.

== Biography ==
In 1977, she graduated with a Master's degree in biology from the University of Warsaw. In 1979, she started working at the Nencki Institute of Experimental Biology of the Polish Academy of Sciences. In 1987–1988, she obtained her PhD. In 1991–1993, she was a postdoctoral fellow at McGill University.

She worked at the Nencki Institute, until 1997 in the Neurochemistry Laboratory. In the years 1998–2016, she co-headed the Laboratory of Reinnervation Processes in the Department of Neurophysiology. In 2004, she obtained her habilitation. In 2014, she obtained the title of professor of biological sciences (awarded in 2015). She was the head of the Department of Neurophysiology at the Nencki Institute from 2014 to 2018. In 2016, she became the head of the Restorative Neurobiology Group. For several terms, she was a member of the institute's Scientific Council.

She was a member of the presidium of the Polish Neuroscience Society (PTBUN); in 2015–2017 she was its president. She became the chairwoman of the Scientific Council of the M. Mossakowski Institute of Experimental Medicine of the Polish Academy of Sciences, a member of the Warsaw Scientific Society and the chairwoman of the Committee on Neurobiology of the Polish Academy of Sciences. She supervised two doctoral dissertations. She retired at the end of 2024.
