= Claustrum =

Structure in the brain

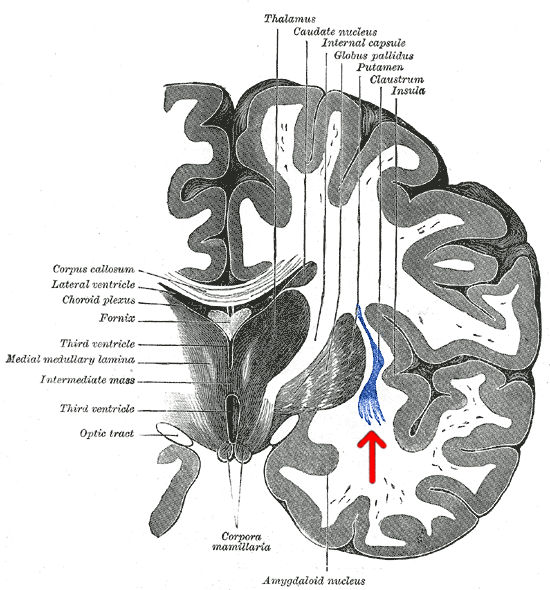
- Coronal section of human cerebrum. The claustrum is indicated by the arrow.

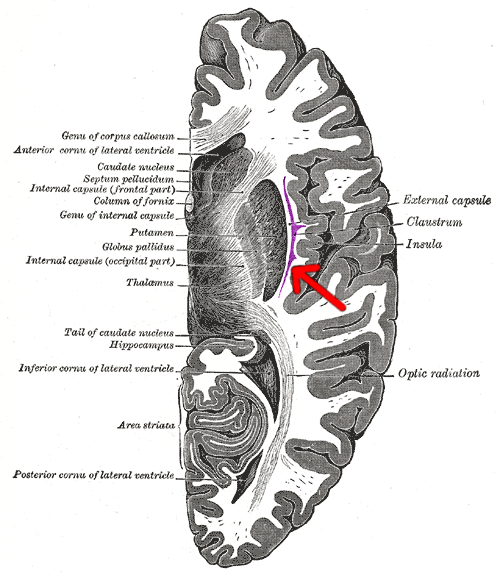
- Transverse section of human cerebrum. (Anterior is at the top.); The claustrum is indicated by the arrow.

Details
- Part of: Brain
- Artery: Middle cerebral artery

Identifiers
- MeSH: D000079482
- NeuroNames: 252
- NeuroLex ID: birnlex_1522
- TA98: A14.1.09.421
- TA2: 5535
- FMA: 67440

The claustrum (Latin, meaning "to close" or "to shut") is a thin sheet of neurons and supporting glial cells in the brain that connects to the cerebral cortex and subcortical regions including the amygdala, hippocampus and thalamus. It is located between the insular cortex laterally and the putamen medially, encased by the extreme and external capsules respectively. Blood to the claustrum is supplied by the middle cerebral artery. It is considered to be the most densely connected structure in the brain, and thus hypothesized to allow for the integration of various cortical inputs such as vision, sound and touch, into one experience. Other hypotheses suggest that the claustrum plays a role in salience processing, to direct attention towards the most behaviorally relevant stimuli amongst the background noise. The claustrum is difficult to study given the limited number of individuals with claustral lesions and the poor resolution of neuroimaging.

The claustrum is made up of various cell types differing in size, shape and neurochemical composition. Five cell types exist, and a majority of these cells resemble pyramidal neurons found in the cortex. Within the claustrum, there is no laminar organization of cell types as in the cortical layers, and the cell bodies can be a pyramidal, fusiform or circular. The principal cell type found in the claustrum is the Golgi type I neuron, which is a large cell with dendrites covered in spines.

Through interhemispheric connections, the claustrum is believed to play a role in synchronizing activity in widely separated, but functionally related, parts of the brain such as between frontal eye fields and the visual cortex. As such, the claustrum is thought to play a role in combining different information modalities, potentially to support consciousness itself. Another proposed function of the claustrum is to differentiate between relevant and irrelevant information so that the latter can be ignored.

Cortical components of consciousness include the fronto-parietal cortex, cingulate and precuneus. Due to the claustrum's widespread connectivity to these areas, it is suggested that it may play a role in both attention and consciousness. The neural networks that mediate sustained attention and consciousness send inputs to the claustrum, and one case report in humans suggests that electrical stimulation near the claustrum reversibly disrupted the patient's conscious state.

== Structure ==
The claustrum is a small bilateral gray matter structure only a few tenths of a millimeter thick located deep to the insular cortex and extreme capsule, and superficial to the external capsule and basal ganglia. Despite this thinness, the claustrum spans more than 5 cm both anteroposteriorly and superoinferiorly. A 2026 histological reconstruction put its total volume at about 0.13% of the brain which is roughly twice that of the substantia nigra and three-quarters that of the amygdala.

Its name means "hidden away", and was first identified in 1672, with more detailed descriptions coming later on during the 19th century. Although the regional neuroanatomical boundaries of the claustrum have been defined, there remains a lack of consensus in the literature when defining its precise margins, though a meeting in 2019 of experts has posited a framework by which to refer to the structures across species.

=== Connections ===
An early summary of reports from the 20th century emphasized cortical inputs and outputs. However, later work has suggested the claustrum has extensive connections to cortical and subcortical regions. More specifically, electrophysiological studies show extensive connections to thalamic nuclei and the basal ganglia, while isotopological reports have linked the claustrum with the prefrontal, frontal, parietal, temporal and occipital cortices. Additional studies have also looked at the relationship of the claustrum to well-described subcortical white matter tracts. Structures such as the corona radiata, occipitofrontal fasciculus and uncinate fasciculus project to the claustrum from frontal, pericentral, parietal and occipital regions. Reciprocal connections also exist with motor, somatosensory, auditory and visual cortical regions. Altogether, these findings leave the claustrum as the most highly connected structure per regional volume in the brain and suggest that it may serve as a hub to coordinate activity of cerebral circuits. Even with this extensive connectivity, most projections to and from the claustrum are ipsilateral (although there are still contralateral projections), and little evidence exists to describe its afferent or efferent connections with the brainstem and spinal cord. In summary, the cortical and subcortical connectivity of the claustrum implies that it is most involved with processing sensory information, as well as the physical and emotional state of an animal.

=== Microanatomy ===
Inputs to the claustrum are organized by modality, which include prefrontal, visual, auditory and somatomotor processing areas. In the same way that the morphology of neurons in the Rexed laminae of the spinal cord is indicative of function, the visual, auditory and somatomotor regions within the claustrum share similar neurons with specific functional characteristics. For example, the portion of the claustrum that processes visual information (primarily synthesizing afferent fibers concerned with our peripheral visual field) is comprised by a majority of binocular cells that have "elongated receptive fields and no orientation selectivity".

This focus on the peripheral sensory system is not an isolated occurrence, as most sensory afferents entering the claustrum bring peripheral sensory information. Moreover, the claustrum possesses a distinct topological organization for each sensory modality as well as the dense connectivity it shares with frontal cortices. For example, there is a retinotopic organization within the visual processing area of the claustrum that mirrors that of visual association cortices and V1, in a similar (yet less complicated) manner to the retinotopic conservation within the lateral geniculate nucleus.

Within the claustrum, local connectivity is dominated by feed-forward disynaptic inhibition wherein parvalbumin-expressing interneurons suppress the activity of nearby projection neurons. Local interneurons themselves are connected through both chemical and electrical synapses, allowing for widespread and synchronous inhibition of local claustrum circuitry. In recent studies of the claustrum in mice and bats, cortically-projecting excitatory claustrum neurons were found to form synapses across the anteroposterior axis and were biased toward neurons that do not share projection targets, with the possible function of joining the activity of different afferent modules. Combined, these two circuits suggest that the claustrum is capable of performing local transformations of diverse input information from across the brain.

=== Cell types ===
The claustrum is made up of various cell types that differ in size, shape and neurochemical composition. Excitatory cell types in the claustrum consist of two main classes which differentially project to cortical and subcortical brain regions. Inhibitory neurons represent only 10%-15% of the neurons within the claustrum and consist of three types, expressing parvalbumin, somatostatin or vasoactive intestinal peptide, similar to inhibitory neurons in the cortex. Finally, many studies show that the claustrum is best distinguished structurally by its prominent plexus of parvalbumin-positive fibers formed by parvalbumin-expressing inhibitory cell types. In recent studies, the use of myelin basic protein (MBP) and retrogradely traveling cholera toxin have additionally been used as effective methods of identifying the claustrum.

Several approaches in mice have been used to assess claustrum cell types, including electrophysiological, morphological, genetic, and connectomic approaches. While no clear consensus has yet been reached regarding the exact number of excitatory cell types, recent studies have suggested that cortically- and subcortically-projecting claustrum neurons are likely distinct and vary along several metrics, such as their intrinsic electrophysiological profiles, afferent projections, and neuromodulatory profiles.

== Function ==
The claustrum has been shown to have widespread activity to numerous cortical components, all of which have been associated with having components of consciousness and sustained attention. This is because of widespread connectivity to fronto-parietal areas, cingulate cortex, and thalami. Sustained attention is from the connections to the cingulate cortex, temporal cortex, and thalamus.

Crick and Koch suggest that the claustrum has a role similar to that of a conductor within an orchestra as it attempts to co-ordinate the function of all connections. This "conductor" analogy can also be supported through connections between the claustral, sensory, and frontal regions. The claustrum has been confirmed to be reciprocally connected to the prefrontal cortex, visual, auditory, sensory, and motor regions respectively. Connections to these modalities provide insight into the functionality of the claustrum. Here it is proposed that the claustrum functions in the gating of selective attention. Through this gating process the claustrum can selectively control input from these modalities to facilitate the process of "focusing". It has also been suggested that it operates in the opposite context; that through divisive normalization the claustrum may implement resistance to certain input modalities to prevent "distraction".

=== Potential function ===
The claustrum, in order to facilitate consciousness, would need to integrate various sensory and motor modalities from various parts of the cortex. The anatomical connections of the claustrum have been observed using diffusion tensor imaging (DTI). A functional magnetic resonance imaging (fMRI) scan looks at oxygenated blood levels in the brain as a way of observing the activity of specific cortical areas. fMRI scans show dampened activity when anesthetized versus awake in rats, specifically claustrum connections to the medial prefrontal cortex (mPFC) and the mediodorsal thalamus (MD thalamus). The claustrum is connected with the contralateral hemisphere's claustrum with strong, functional connections. Connections with MD thalamus, mPFC, and surrounding and distant cortical areas also exist.

Electrical stimulation in the dorsal claustrum of cats elicits excitatory responses within the visual cortex. The claustrum is situated anatomically at the confluence of a large number of white-matter tracts used to connect different parts of the cortex. This further suggests an integration center role for these different modalities, such as sensory and motor. Gap junctions have been shown to exist between aspiny (lacking dendrite projections) interneurons of the claustrum – suggesting a role in its ability to synchronize these modalities as input is received.

Additional studies point to involvement in spatial navigation and slow-wave sleep.

=== Attention ===
The claustrum has the differential ability to select between task-relevant information and task-irrelevant information to provide directed attention. It contains the highest density of connecting white matter tracts in the cortex. This supports the notion of networking and coordination among different regions of the brain. The claustrum has regional specificity to it; information coming in from visual centers project to specific areas of grey matter neurons in the structure and the auditory cortex. Unexpected stimuli also activate the claustrum, effecting an immediate focusing or allocation of function. In lower mammals (e.g. rats), claustral regions receive input from somatosensory modalities, such as whiskers' motor control perspective because of its sensory and discriminatory use in these mammals.

Functionally, it is proposed that it segregates attention between these modalities. Attention itself has been considered as top-down processing or bottom-up processing; both fit contextually with what is observed in the claustrum structurally and functionally, supporting the notion that interactions occur with high-order sensory areas involved in encoding objects and features. Input from the prefrontal cortex, for example, will define attention based upon higher-cognitive task-driven behaviour. Moreover, induction of electrical stimulation to the claustrum has been shown to cause inhibition of reading, a blank stare, and unresponsiveness. It has been reported that the claustrum has a basal frequency firing that is modulated to increase or decrease with directed attention. For example, projections to motor and oculomotor areas would assist with gaze movement to direct attention to new stimuli by increasing the firing frequency of claustral neurons.

Salvinorin A, the active hallucinogenic compound found in Salvia divinorum, is capable of inducing loss of awareness. Consumption of salvinorin A can induce synesthesia, in which different sensory modalities are interpreted by different sensory cortices. (For example: seeing sounds, tasting colours.) This supports the idea of intrathalamic segregation and conduction (attention). The claustrum has kappa opioid receptors to which Salvinorin A binds, eliciting this effect.

=== Empirical evidence ===
High frequency stimulation (HFS) in cat claustrum(s) has the capability to induce autonomic changes and induce "inactivation syndrome". This syndrome is described as a decrease in awareness, indicating the relationship between the claustrum and consciousness. In humans this same effect can be observed. Stimulation of the left claustrum in humans has produced "a complete arrest of volitional behavior, unresponsiveness, and amnesia without negative motor symptoms, or mere aphasia" suggesting the involvement in consciousness. Furthermore, MRI studies have shown that increased signal intensity within the claustrum has been associated with status epilepticus – a condition in which epileptic seizures follow one another without recovery of consciousness between events. As well, increased signal intensity is associated with focal dyscognitive seizures, which are seizures that elicit impairment of awareness or consciousness without convulsions. The individual becomes unaware of his or her environment, and the seizure will manifest as a blank or empty stare for a window of time.

Using an operant conditioning task combined with HFS of the claustrum resulted in significant behavioural changes of rats; this included modulated motor responses, inactivity and decreased responsiveness. Beyond this, studies have also shown that the claustrum is active during REM sleep, alongside other structures such as the dentate gyrus. These have associative roles in spatial memory, suggesting that some form of memory consolidation takes place in these areas.

=== Lesions and consciousness ===
Functionally, the claustrum will integrate various cortical inputs through its connections into consciousness. Based upon its structure and connectivity, its function is suggested to be related to coordination of different brain functions; i.e. the conductor analogy. Consciousness functionally can be divided into two components: (i) wakefulness, which is arousal and alertness; (ii) content of consciousness, which is the processing of content.

A study of traumatic brain injuries in war veterans was undertaken to better understand the functional role of the claustrum. Damage to the claustrum was associated with the duration of one's loss of consciousness, but not its frequency. Lesion size was correlated with a longer duration of LOC events. No consequences were shown to attenuate cognitive processing.

In a single-case study, consciousness was shown to be disrupted when there was stimulation to the extreme capsule of the brain – which is in close proximity to the claustrum – such that upon termination of stimulation, consciousness was regained. Another study looking at the symptomology of schizophrenia established that the severity of delusions was associated with decreased grey matter volume of the left claustrum; postulating that correlations exist between the structure and positive symptoms seen in this psychiatric disorder. Further supporting this correlation between schizophrenia and the claustrum is that there is an increase in white matter volume entering the claustrum. Inverse correlations between grey matter volume and severity of hallucinations in the context of auditory hallucinations of schizophrenia has been supported. As well, to see the total loss of function of the claustrum, lesions to both claustrums on each hemisphere would need to occur.

However, a study in 2019, consisting of electrical stimulation of the claustrum, found no disruption of consciousness in any of the five patients that were subjected to the analysis. The tested patients reported subjective experiences in various sensory domains and exhibited reflexive movement, but none of them displayed loss of consciousness, thus questioning the claustrum's ability to disrupt consciousness when stimulated electrically.

== Clinical significance ==
=== Schizophrenia ===
Damage to the claustrum may mimic various common diseases or mental disorders; delayed development of the structure appears to be linked to autism. The claustrum may be involved in schizophrenia as findings show an increase in positive symptoms, such as delusions, when the grey matter volume of the left claustrum and right insula is decreased.

New-onset refractory status epilepticus with claustrum damage

=== Epilepsy ===
The claustrum is also seen to play a role in epilepsy; MRIs have found increased claustral signal intensity in people who have been diagnosed with epilepsy. In certain cases, seizures tend to appear to originate from the claustrum when they are involved in early kainic acid induced seizures.

=== Consciousness ===
A single case-study showed that consciousness was disrupted when the area between the insula and claustrum was electrically stimulated; consciousness was regained when stimulation stopped. Patients that had a lesion in their left claustrum were more likely to experience a loss of consciousness compared to those that presented with lesions outside of the claustrum. For example, a patient that was subjected to electrode stimulation at the claustrum stopped reading, stared blankly and was unresponsive. Once the electrode was removed, the patient resumed reading and could not remember the events of being dazed.

A 2019 study consisting of electrical stimulation of the claustrum found no disruption of consciousness in any of the five patients that were subjected to the analysis. The tested patients reported subjective experiences in various sensory domains and exhibited reflexive movement, but none of them displayed loss of consciousness, thus questioning the claustrum's ability to disrupt consciousness when stimulated electrically.

A 2020 study involving artificial activation of the claustrum by optogenetic light stimulation silenced brain activity across the cortex, a phenomenon known as a "Down state," which can be seen when mice are sleeping or resting awake (quiet wakefulness). The authors state that 'The claustrum is a coordinator of global slow-wave activity, and it is so exciting that we are getting closer to linking specific brain connections and actions with the ultimate puzzle of consciousness.'

However, cognitive scientist Stevan Harnad does not consider the claustrum to be a "switch" for consciousness, but merely for wakefulness. He claims that if the claustrum were truly a switch for consciousness, artificial activation of the claustrum would not result in the patient passing out, but instead the patient would continue behaving normally, and later report that they experienced no sensations during the period of time when their claustrum was being stimulated.

=== Psilocybin ===
The claustrum expresses a high density of 5-HT_{2A} receptors, meaning it is significantly affected by serotonergic psychedelics like psilocybin. Psilocybin appears to affect the functional connectivity of the claustrum with the default mode network (DMN), and the fronto-parietal task control network (FPTC). Psilocybin was found to significantly decrease functional connectivity of the right claustrum with the default mode network, and increase right claustrum connectivity with the fronto-parietal task control network.

=== Parkinsonism ===
A team of investigators led by neuroscientists at Beth Israel Deaconess Medical Center has identified lesions in the claustrum as the likely origin of parkinsonism across different conditions. The team used a novel methodology called lesion network mapping to discover the origins of parkinsonism in 29 patients whose symptoms were not the result of Parkinson's disease but rather attributed to a brain lesion – an abnormality or injury to the brain visible on brain imaging. The mapping of the 29 lesions – which were located in different regions of the brain – revealed that connectivity to the claustrum was the single most sensitive and specific marker of lesion-induced parkinsonism.

=== Anxiety and stress ===
In mice, suppression of claustrum appears to attenuate anxiety/stress and increase chronic stress-resistance.

== Other animals ==
In animals, through tract tracing, findings have shown that the claustrum has extensive connections throughout the cortex with sensory and motor regions along with the hippocampus. A variety of animal models have been used such as cats, rodents and monkeys.

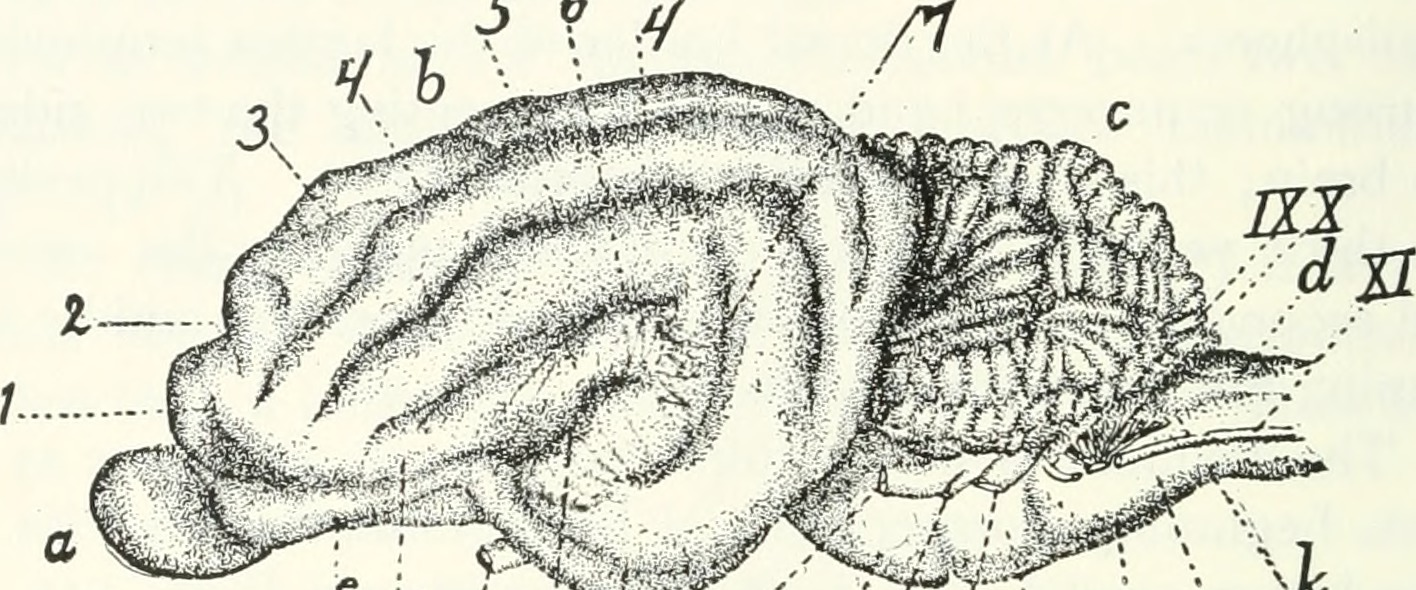
Anatomy of a cat brain

=== Cats ===
In cats, high-frequency stimulation (HFS) of the claustrum can alter motor activity, induce autonomic changes, and precipitate an "inactivation syndrome" described as "decreased awareness". Recordings, primarily in cats and primates, show that claustral neurons respond to sensory stimuli and also respond during voluntary movements. Mapping from visual cortex to claustrum includes just a single map, which includes V1 and three other visual areas. Cells in the V1 are part of layer 6, and are different to cells that go to the lateral geniculate nucleus; these cells use glutamate as their neurotransmitter.

The cat claustrum has 3 defined zones: (1) the anterior dorsal zone, which connects to the motor and somatosensory cortex, (2) the posterior dorsal zone that has connections to the visual cortex and (3) a third zone that is ventral to the visual one and connects to the auditory areas.

Sensory input is segregated based on modalities and there is a high preference for peripheral sensory information. In the cat, input is received from various visual cortical areas and projects back to the area. These loops are retinotopical, meaning that regions getting visual input are responsible for the same region in the visual field as the area of the cortex that projects to the claustrum. The visual claustrum is a single map of the contralateral visual hemifield, receiving information based on motion in the visual field's periphery and has no real selectivity.

In terms of somatosensation, cat claustrum receives dense inputs from primary somatosensory cortex (S1), but weaker inputs from secondary somatosensory cortex (S2). The inputs from S1 overlap with inputs from primary motor cortex (at least those from the forepaw representations of both). Rodent claustrum does not receive input from S1 or S2, and is primarily driven by motor cortex.

=== Rodents ===
In rats, motor whisker areas receive input from the ipsilateral claustrum but will then project to the contralateral claustrum. The sensory barrel cortex and primary visual cortex also receive input from the ipsilateral claustrum but send very few projection back to the claustrum. Studies therefore indicate distinct patterning of connectivity of claustrum with different cortical areas. These suggest, rather than a diffuse role, they play specialized roles in cortical processing.

In mice, parvalbumin fibres are highly interconnected by chemical and electrical synapses. They are additionally also highly interconnected with claustrocortical neurons – suggesting that these inhibitory interneurons strongly modulate their activity. These local networks suggest to synchronize activity of claustrocortical projections to therefore influence brain rhythms and co-ordinated activity of different cortical brain regions. There are additional classes of inhibitory interneurons with local connections within the claustrocortical neurons.

Experiments in mice monitoring claustrocortical axonal activity to changing visual stimuli suggest the claustrum signals stimulus changes. Although claustrocortical input to visual cortical areas were engaged, the strongest responses measured were in higher-order regions of the cortex, this included the anterior cingulate cortex which is densely innervated by claustral projection.

=== Monkeys ===
In the monkey, there are widespread connections of the claustrum with allocortical and neocortical regions. These connections project towards the frontal lobe, visual cortical regions, temporal cortex, parieto-occipital cortex and somatosensory areas amongst others. The subcortical areas receiving projections are the amygdala, caudate nucleus and hippocampus. It is unknown if there are cortical regions that do not receive input from the claustrum. Additionally, large or small types of aspiny neurons are reported in the monkey brain, which are classified as "local circuit neurons".

The dorsal claustrum has bi-directional connections with motor structures in the cortex. The relationship between the animal's movement and how neurons in the dorsocaudal claustrum behave are as follows: 70% of movement neurons are non-selective and can fire to do any push, pull or turn movements in the forelimb; the rest were more discerning and did only one of the three movements listed above.

== See also ==
- Lentiform nucleus
