= Lentiform nucleus =

Structure in the basal ganglia of the brain

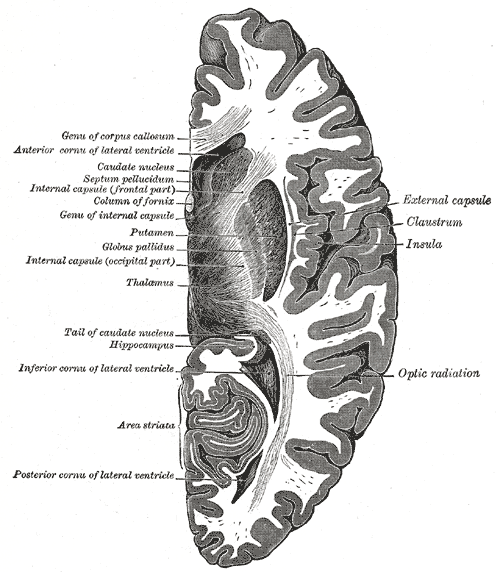
- Putamen and globus pallidus make up the lentiform nucleus.

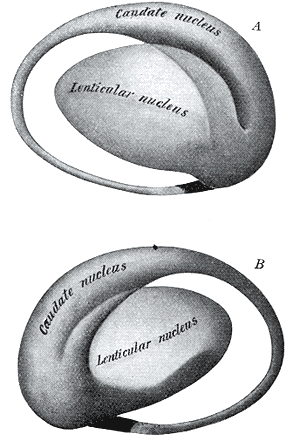
- Two views of a model of the striatum (i.e. lentiform nucleus plus the caudate nucleus) of the right cerebral hemisphere: A, lateral aspect; B, medial aspect

Details

Identifiers
- Latin: nucleus lentiformis
- NeuroNames: 1234
- TA98: A14.1.09.506
- TA2: 5567
- FMA: 77615

The lentiform nucleus (or lentiform complex, lenticular nucleus, or lenticular complex) are the putamen (laterally) and the globus pallidus (medially), collectively. Due to their proximity, these two structures were formerly considered one, however, the two are separated by a thin layer of white matter—the external medullary lamina—and are functionally and connectionally distinct.

The lentiform nucleus is a large, lens-shaped mass of gray matter just lateral to the internal capsule. It forms part of the basal ganglia. With the caudate nucleus, it forms the dorsal striatum.

== Structure ==
When divided horizontally, it exhibits, to some extent, the appearance of a biconvex lens, while a coronal section of its central part presents a somewhat triangular outline.

It is shorter than the caudate nucleus and does not extend as far forward.

=== Relations ===
It is deep/medial to the insular cortex, with which it is coextensive; the two are separated by intervening structures.

It is lateral to the caudate nucleus and thalamus, and is seen only in sections of the hemisphere.

It is bounded laterally by a lamina of a white substance called the external capsule, and lateral to this is a thin layer of gray substance termed the claustrum.

Its anterior end is continuous with the lower part of the head of the caudate nucleus and with the anterior perforated substance.

Inferiorly, there is a groove upon the surface of the lenticular nucleus that accommodates the anterior commissure.

=== Components ===
In a coronal section through the middle of the lentiform nucleus, two medullary laminae are seen dividing it into three parts.

The lateral and largest part is of a reddish color, and is known as the putamen, while the medial and intermediate are of a yellowish tint, and together constitute the globus pallidus; all three are marked by fine radiating white fibers, which are most distinct in the putamen.

== Pathology ==
Increased volume of the lentiform nuclei has been observed in obsessive–compulsive disorder, with decreased volume conversely observed in other anxiety disorders.

The lentiform nucleus is involved in the pathology of Wilson's disease as it is one of the neuroanatomical locations of copper deposition.

== Etymology ==
The name comes from Latin and means lens-shaped, probably referring to the appearance of the nucleus from the side.

== Gallery ==
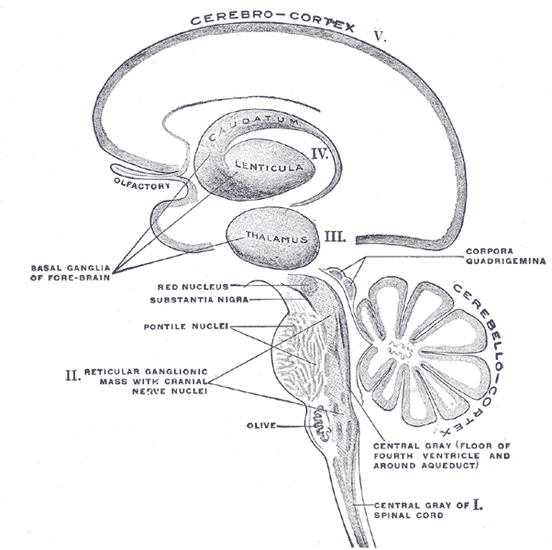
Schematic representation of the chief ganglionic categories (I to V)

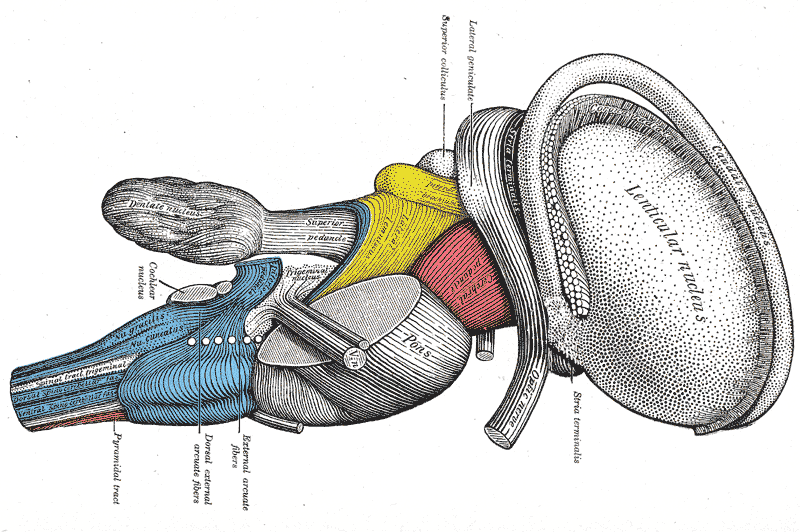
Dissection of brain-stem. Lateral view.

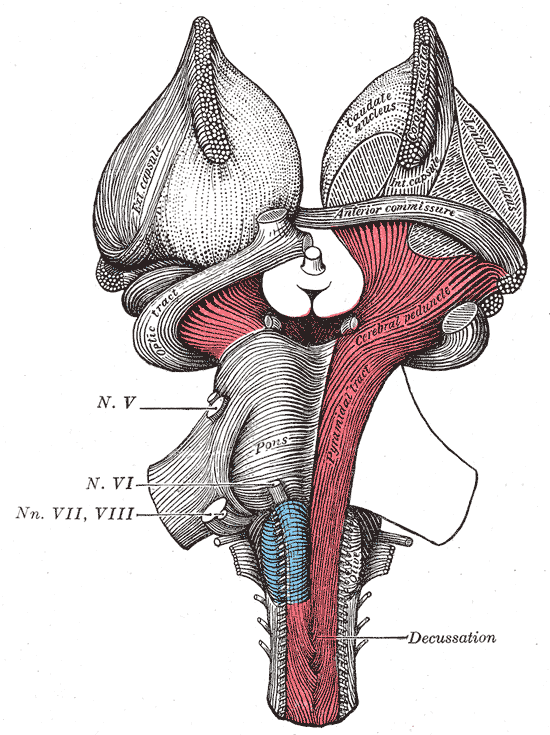
Superficial dissection of brain-stem. Ventral view.

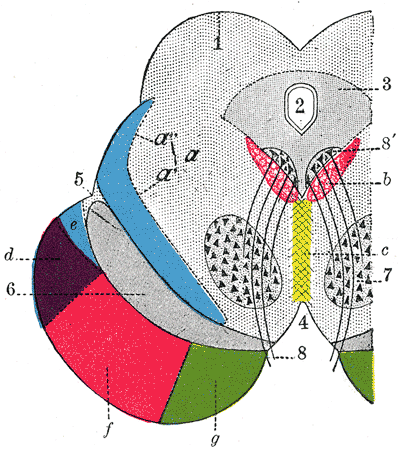
Transverse section through mid-brain

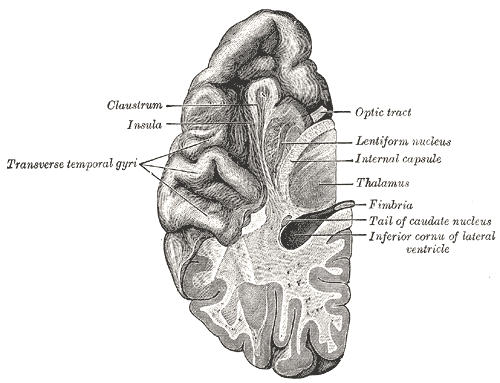
Section of brain showing upper surface of temporal lobe

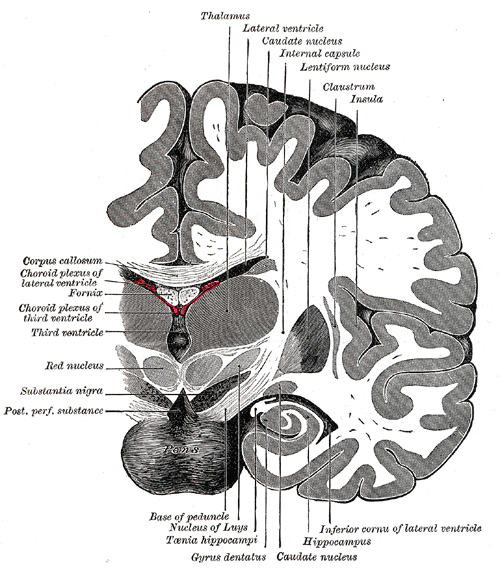
Coronal section of brain immediately in front of pons

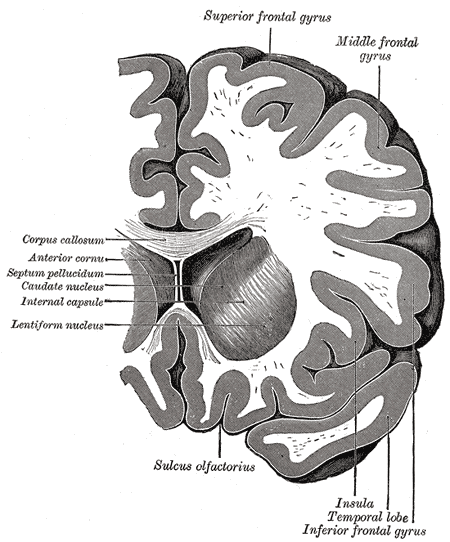
Coronal section through anterior cornua of lateral ventricles

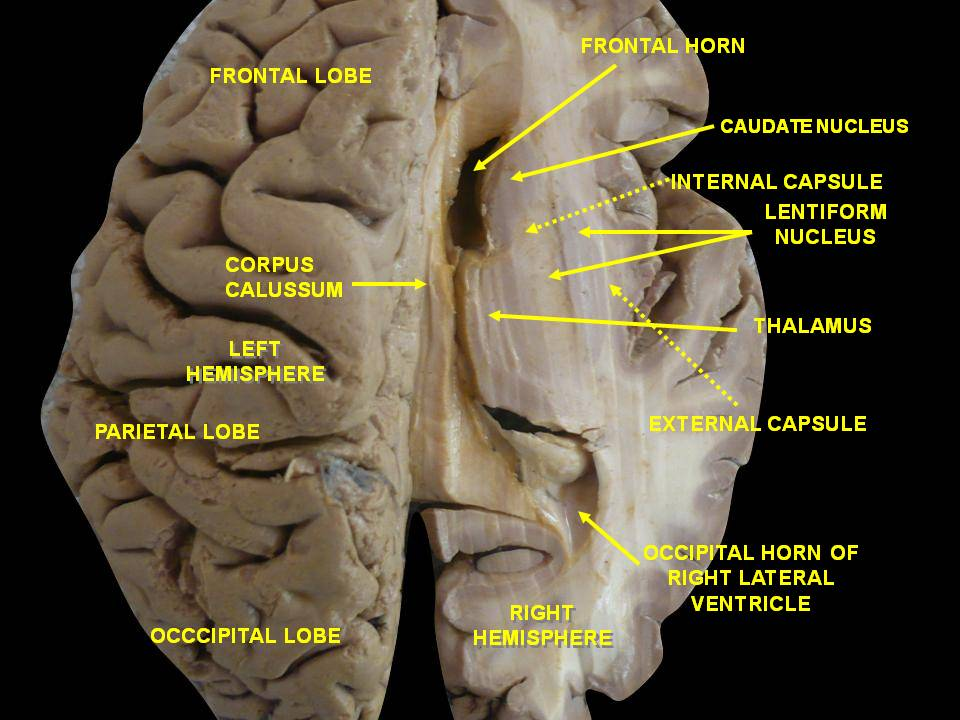
Ventricles of brain and basal ganglia. Superior view. Horizontal section. Deep dissection.

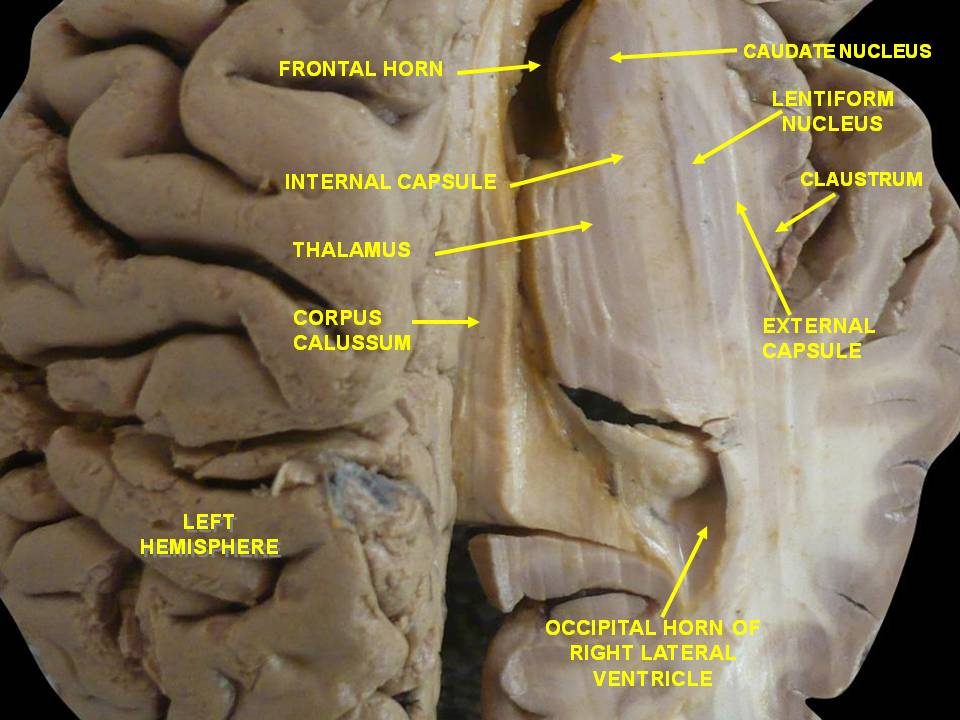
Ventricles of brain and basal ganglia. Superior view. Horizontal section. Deep dissection.

== See also ==
- Striatum
