= Wioletta Waleszczyk =

Polish biologist (1962–2020)

- Citizenship: Polish
- Education: University of Warsaw
- Occupation: Biologist

Wioletta Joanna Waleszczyk (28 March 1962 – 15 March 2020) was a biologist and researcher at the Nencki Institute of Experimental Biology of the Polish Academy of Sciences.

== Biography ==
In 1988 she graduated in physics from the University of Warsaw. In 1995 she obtained doctorate upon thesis Organizacja wzrokowych pól recepcyjnych neuronów jądra parabigeminalnego u czuwającego kota supervised by Krystyna Dec. In 2006 she obtained habilitation. In 2017 she obtained title of professor. She collaborated with Bogdan Dreher. She was awarded with Gold Cross of Merit.
