= Małgorzata Kossut =

Polish neurobiologist (born 1950)

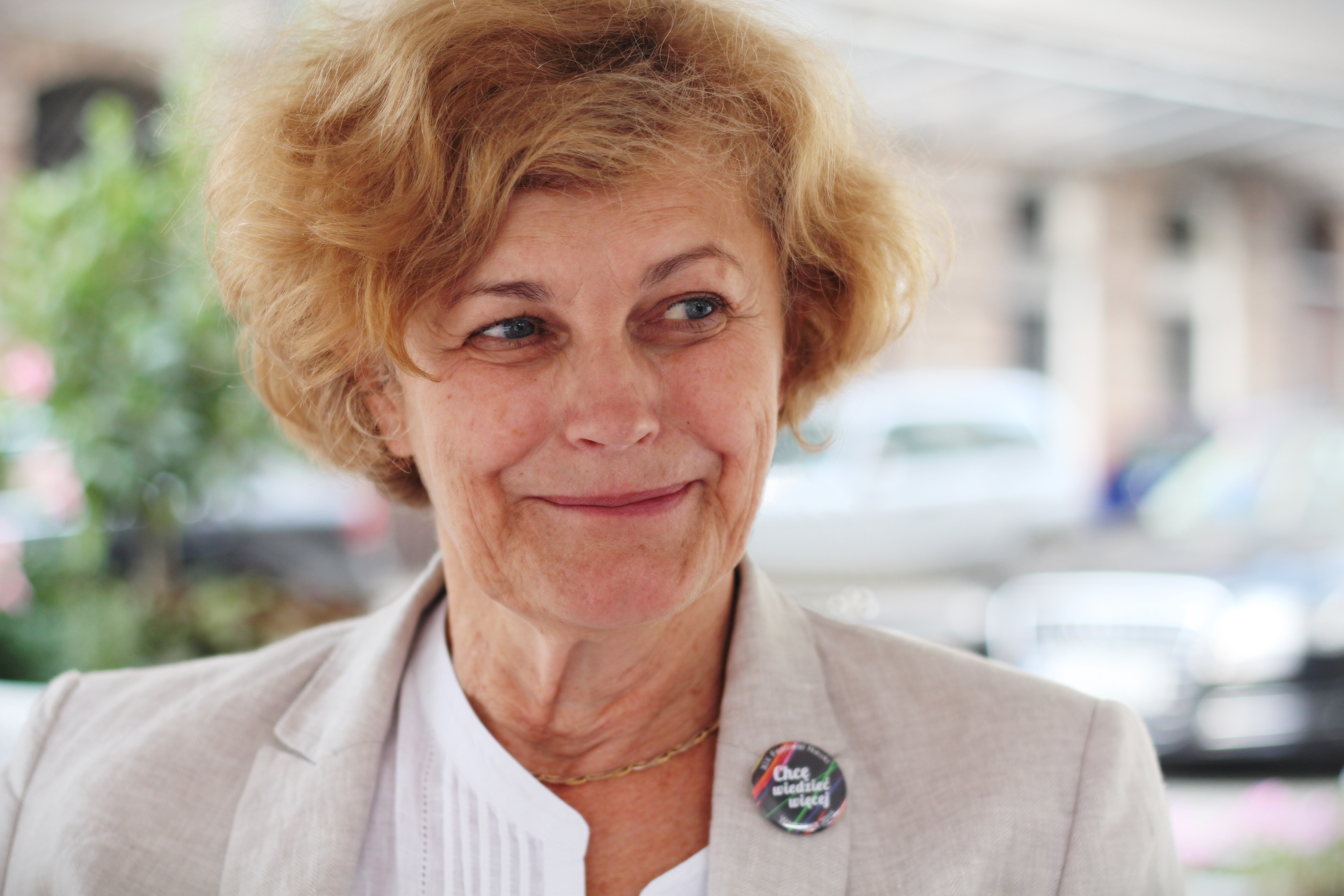
- Born: 10 March 1950 (age 76); Warsaw, Poland
- Education: University of Warsaw
- Occupation: Neuroscientist

Małgorzata Kossut (born 10 March 1950) is a Polish neuroscientist specializing in neuroplasticity and neural mechanisms of learning and memory, professor of natural sciences, Head of Department of Molecular and Cellular Neurobiology and Laboratory of Neuroplasticity of the Nencki Institute of Experimental Biology, member of the Polish Academy of Sciences.

== Life and work ==
She graduated in biology from the University of Warsaw in 1973. Then she studied at the Nencki Institute of Experimental Biology of the Polish Academy of Sciences in Warsaw, where she examined the changes occurring in the cerebral cortex of animals that were subject to sensory deprivation. She obtained her Ph.D. at the Nencki Institute in 1976. In 1994 she was awarded with the title of professor of natural sciences. Since 1976 she works at the Nencki Institute of Experimental Biology, where she is Head of Department of Molecular and Cellular Neurobiology and Laboratory of Neuroplasticity.

Since 1998 she is a member of European DANA Alliance for the Brain. She was a chairman of the Committee of Neurobiology of the Polish Academy of Sciences (2005–2008) and was elected a board member of the European Brain and Behaviour Society (for years 2012–2015). She was the president of the Polish Neuroscience Society between 1992–1995 and 2001–2003.

Since 2009 he has been the Head of the Department of Psychophysiology of Cognitive Processes at the University of Social Sciences and Humanities.

== Research ==
Her team's research focuses on the molecular mechanisms of neuroplasticity induced by the learning of rodents, the development of the optic tract of cats and after the stroke and during aging in humans.

== Selected works ==
- Kossut, Małgorzata (1994). Mechanizmy plastyczności mózgu. PWN. Edited by.
- "Neuroplastyczność". Mózg a zachowanie. Warszawa: Wydawnictwo Naukowe PWN. 2006. pp. 590–613. ISBN 978-83-01-14447-0.
