= Extreme capsule =

White matter structure of the brain

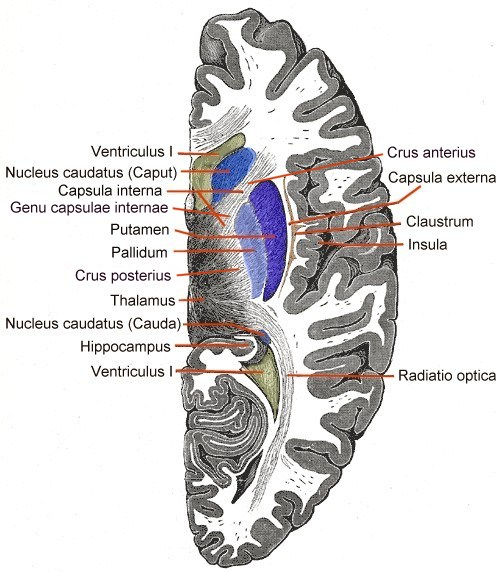

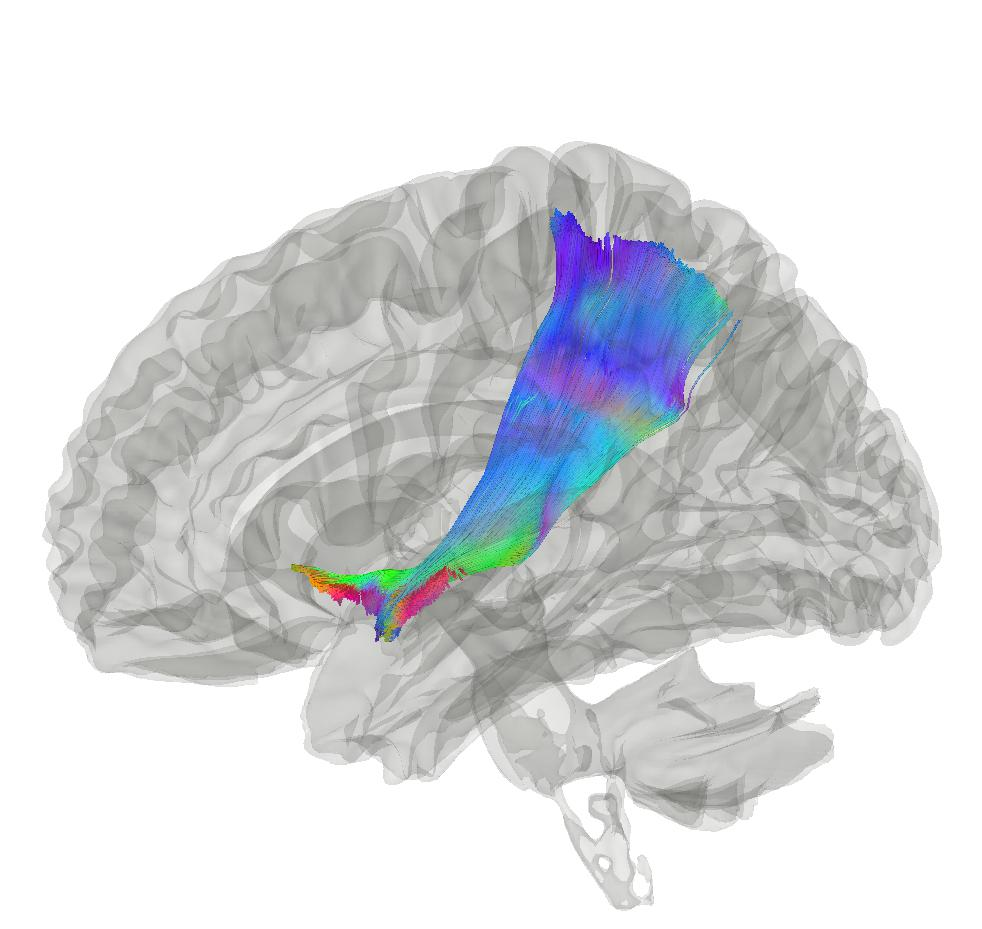
- Tractography showing extreme capsule fibers

Details

Identifiers
- Latin: capsula extrema
- NeuroNames: 254
- NeuroLex ID: nlx_21887
- TA98: A14.1.09.552
- TA2: 5589
- FMA: 61960

The extreme capsule (Latin: capsula extrema) is a series of nerve tracts between the claustrum and the insular cortex. It is also described as a thin capsule of white matter as association fibres. The extreme capsule is separated from the external capsule by the claustrum, and the extreme capsule separates the claustrum from the insular cortex, and all these lie lateral to the corpus striatum components.

From the midline of the brain to the side, the extreme capsule is the outermost from the external capsule and the inner internal capsule.

It is most easily visible in a horizontal section, just lateral to the claustrum.

In terms of its function, the extreme capsule is thought to be involved in the ventral stream of language and also the limbic system. The extreme capsule is involved in picture-naming, suggesting that it plays a role in retrieving the meaning of words from memory.

== Additional images ==
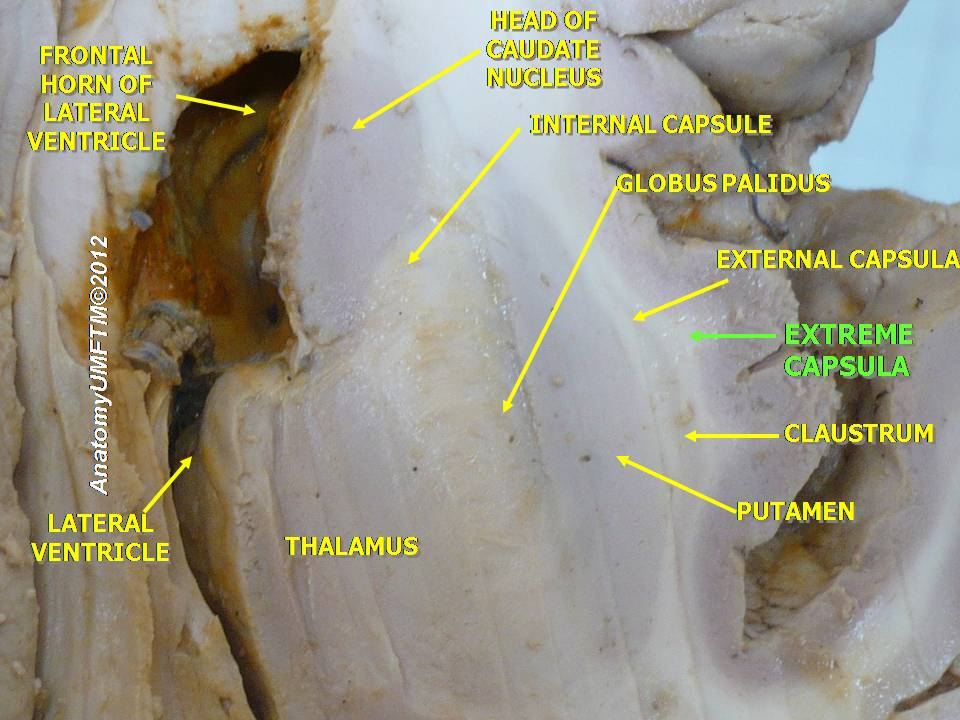
Extreme capsule

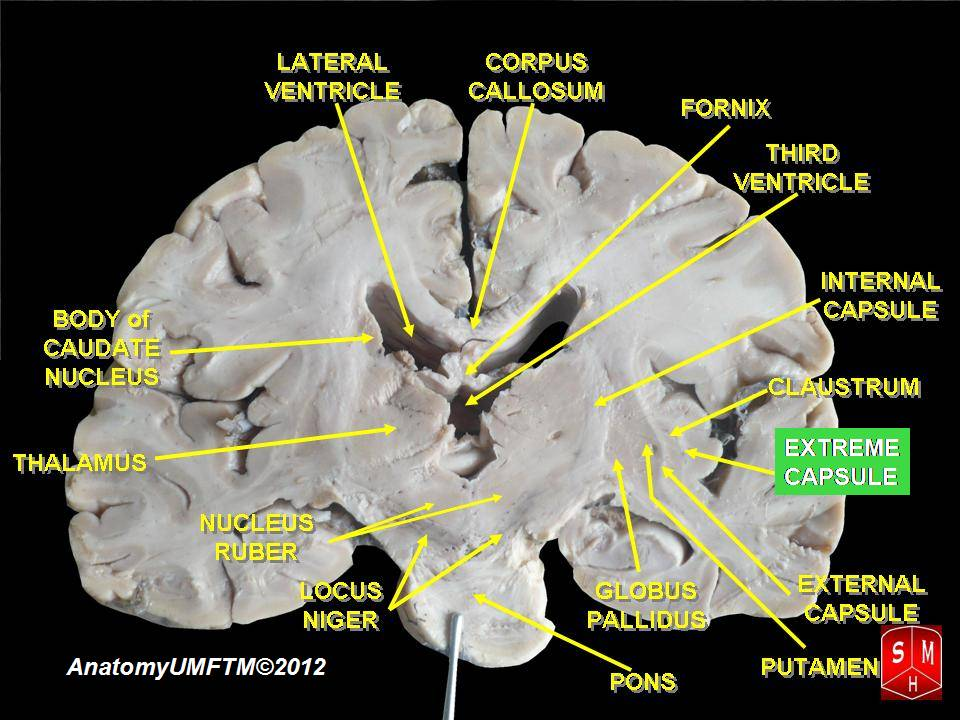
Extreme capsule
