= Jerzy Konorski =

Polish neurophysiologist

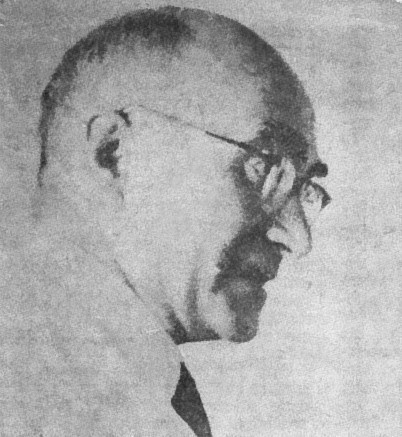
- Konorski, c. 1970
- Born: 1 December 1903; Łódź, Congress Poland
- Died: 14 November 1973 (aged 69); Warsaw, Poland
- Education: University of Warsaw
- Known for: neural plasticity; operant conditioning; secondary conditioned reflexes; gnostic neurons
- Awards: Officer's Cross of the Order of Polonia Restituta
- Scientific career
- Fields: Neurophysiology, neuropsychology
- Workplaces: Nencki Institute of Experimental Biology

Jerzy Konorski (1 December 1903 in Łódź, Congress Poland – 14 November 1973 in Warsaw, Poland) was a Polish neurophysiologist who further developed the work of Ivan Pavlov by discovering secondary conditioned reflexes and operant conditioning. He also proposed the idea of gnostic neurons, a concept similar to the grandmother cell. He coined the term neural plasticity, and he developed theoretical ideas regarding it that are similar to those proposed soon after by Donald Hebb.

== Secondary conditioned reflexes ==
When he and Stefan Miller were medical students in Warsaw they proposed another type of conditioned reflex in addition to that discovered by Pavlov which was under the control of reward. This has come to be known as "type II conditioned reflexes," or secondary conditioned reflexes Type II conditioned reflexes are now known as operant or instrumental conditioning.

He spent two years at Pavlov's laboratory as the result of a letter that he sent to Pavlov describing this work. Pavlov however was never convinced that instrumental conditioning (which Konorski called "Type II" to distinguish it from Pavlov's "Type I" learning) differed in any important way from his own Type I conditioning.

An exchange between B. F. Skinner and Konorski also occurred over the two types of learning. Skinner had originally referred to operant conditioning as Type I and Pavlovian conditioning as Type II. Konorski agreed to revise his nomenclature to avoid confusion.

== Neural plasticity ==
Konorski married the neurophysiologist Liliana Lubinska, who obtained her doctorate with Louis Lapicque. Konorski, Lubinska, and Miller established a laboratory at the Nencki Institute of Experimental Biology. With Konorski's knowledge of neurophysiology greatly expanded through his collaboration with Lubinska, he turned his attention to the neural mechanisms that underlie conditioning.

Konorski asked how pre-existing connections between neurons in the brain could be changed by conditioning. He suggested an idea similar to Hebb in which coincidental activation in time causes the potential connections to be transformed into actual excitatory connections. Inhibitory connections arise when the excitation of one input coincides in time with a decease in its associated connection. He described the process: "The plastic changes would be related to the formation and multiplication of new synaptic junctions between the axon terminals of one nerve cell and the soma (i.e. the body and the dendrites) of the other" This idea that synapses strengthen with use was also proposed in the West in the theory of Hebbian synapses by Donald Hebb.

== Grandmother cells ==
Konorski first proposed two key concepts in neuroscience (independently of Western scientists who also suggested them). The grandmother cell of the West which Konorski called "gnostic unit." This was developed in great detail in his 1967 book.

== Publications ==
He was the author of two important books on learning, Conditioned Reflexes and Neuron Organization (1948), and Integrative Activity of the Brain (1967). The first book, presented one of the first theories of associative learning as a result of long-term neuronal plasticity. In the second, he substantially revised his early theories and synthesised work on associative learning and neurobiology of perception and motivation.

== World War II and Stalin ==
The Department of Neurophysiology at the Nencki Institute of Experimental Biology in Warsaw, Poland was created for him but this was destroyed in the first days of the invasion of Poland in 1939. He failed to get to England to join his brother who lived there. Konorski managed to escape to the Soviet Union where he was appointed the head of the primate laboratory at Sukhumi on the Black Sea in Georgia. Due to German invasion of the Soviet Union, the laboratory was relocated to Tbilisi. He spent much of World War II at Sukhumi treating traumatic injuries of the central nervous system. After the war he returned to Nencki Institute as head of the Department of Neurophysiology. In 1948 Cambridge University Press published his "Conditioned reflexes and neuron organization". Then in 1949, during the peak of Stalinism, at a conference in Leningrad commemorating the 100th anniversary of Pavlov's birth, his book was condemned and rejected. In 1951, at a conference organized in Krynica in support of him, this was shown in a 40-minute period of continuous clapping and applause. With Stalin's death his prosecution ended.

== Legacy ==
Later Konorski became a foreign member of the National Academy of Sciences. Since his death his influence has grown considerably and now recognized as the first to systematically investigate the mechanisms underlying instrumental conditioning.

== See also ==
- List of Polish medical scientists
- Timeline of Polish science and technology
