= Marceli Nencki Institute of Experimental Biology of the Polish Academy of Sciences =

Polish research institute

The Marceli Nencki Institute of Experimental Biology of the Polish Academy of Sciences is a Polish scientific research organization and a part of Polish Academy of Sciences headquartered in Warsaw, Poland. Founded in 1918, it is named after Polish biochemist and medic Marceli Nencki. It is a leading institution in the country in the field of neurobiology, molecular biology, and biochemistry.

== About the Institute ==
The Institute comprises laboratories and equipment for, amongst others, confocal microscopy, electron microscopy, scanning and flow cytometry, magnetic resonance imaging, electrophysiology, or transcranial magnetic stimulation. Currently, the Institute is home to 40 laboratories organised into 4 departments, as well as 6 core facility laboratories forming the Neurobiology Center established in 2013.

The Institute's scientific teams conduct research in neurobiology, neurophysiology, and molecular biology. The experiments are interdisciplinary in character. The research concentrates on systems of varying complexity, from whole organisms through tissues, individual cells, cellular organelles to proteins and genes. The research topics often concentrate on determining signalling pathways whose disruption leads to the development of the disease.

As of January 1, 2014, the Nencki Institute has once again become the owner of the Mikołajki Research Station [1]. The Station is the site of research in the areas of aquatic and terrestrial ecosystem ecology and environmental monitoring.

The Station/Institute is empowered to bestow PhD and DSc doctoral degrees.

The laboratories of the Nencki Institute are organised into 4 separate Departments: Cell Biology, Biochemistry, Molecular and Cell Neurobiology, and Neurophysiology. There are also 6 other laboratories that constitute the Neurobiology Center.

The research conducted in the Departments of Neurophysiology and Molecular and Cell Neurobiology mainly deals with the cognitive functions of the Brain. The dominant theme is the plasticity of the nervous system under normal and pathological conditions. We study the effects of stroke and neurodegenerative diseases, epileptogenesis and the consequences of re-innervation, as well as emotional disturbances in humans.

The research at the Department of Cell Biology is chiefly directed towards elucidating signalling cascades and regulatory mechanisms of gene expression involved in tumour transformation and the immune response, including the participation of membrane lipids in signal transfer by immunoreceptors, as well as the genetic regulation of cytoskeletal reorganisation.

The Department of Biochemistry concentrates its research efforts on describing the molecular mechanisms of lipid-induced insulin resistance and type 2 diabetes, the regulation of calcium-mediated signal pathways, kinesine functioning, the role of mitochondria in the maintenance of cellular homeostasis and the development of pathologies, as well as the elucidation of the structure and function of intracellular ion channels.

The Neurobiology Center conducts interdisciplinary basic research (based on, for example, brain imaging, animal modeling, or bioinformatics) as well as research on novel diagnostic and therapeutic methods in relation to the nervous system. This work is conducted in collaboration with many Warsaw institutes and universities as part of the Innovative Economy Operational Programme the project entitled "Centre for Preclinical Research and Technology CEPT 2007-2013” - but also with research facilities around the world.

== Early history ==
At the end of 1918, Kazimierz Białaszewicz, together with Edward Flatau, head of the Department of Neurobiology, and Romuald Minkiewicz, head of the Department of General Biology established just after Poland regained independence, jointly approached the Management Board of the Warsaw Scientific Society with the initiative of separating these three departments from all TNW laboratories and establishing an independent organization called the Institute of Experimental Biology. Marceli Nencki. It was based on three pre-existing laboratories affiliated with the Scientific Society of Warsaw (Towarzystwo Naukowe Warszawskie): Laboratory of Neurobiology (in existence since 1911), Laboratory of Physiology (in existence since 1913) and Laboratory of General Biology (established in 1918). Formation and development of the Institute were supported in part by a donation of Nadine Sieber-Shumova, a close co-worker of Marceli Nencki from Berne and St. Petersburg.

Over the next two decades, the Institute gained prominence in the field of biological research in Poland. One of its major figures was the neurophysiologist Jerzy Konorski who discovered secondary conditioned reflexes. The outbreak of World War II interrupted a period of its intensive expansion in the field of experimental biology, over a dozen of the Institute's staff lost their lives, and its premises (including most of its 30,000-volume library) was destroyed.

== Post World War II ==
The surviving staff members (professors Jan Dembowski, Jerzy Konorski, and Włodzimierz Niemierko) re-established the Nencki Institute. In 1952 the Institute was incorporated into the newly founded Polish Academy of Sciences, and the Institute's director, Prof. Dembowski, became the first President of the Academy. During the period 1953-55, a newly erected building at 3 Pasteur Street in Warsaw became the new home of the Nencki Institute.

== Recent developments ==
In 1990, the Institute was invited to become a member institution of the Global Network for Molecular and Cell Biology (MCBN) within UNESCO. The Institute hires new researchers and awards approximately 15 doctoral degrees annually and is competitive in securing external funding for research projects. Two European Centres of Excellence were recently formed within the Institute. The Institute has a Ph.D. programme shared with the SWPS University of Social Sciences and Humanities.

== Structure of the Institute ==
The departments within the Institute are:

- Department of Cell Biology
- Department of Biochemistry
- Department of Molecular and Cellular Neurobiology
- Department of Neurophysiology
- Neurobiology Center

The Institute has also state of the art cytometry laboratory, animal house, electron microscopy core facility, informatics laboratory, and on-site small library.

The departments were closed in 2018, joining all laboratories together.

== Researchers ==
- Jan Dembowski
- Jerzy Duszyński
- Małgorzata Kossut
- Jerzy Neyman
- Małgorzata Skup
- Wioletta Waleszczyk

== Bibliography ==
1. M. Kossut, Neuroscience in Poland, Trends in Neurosciences, 1991, vol. 14, no 2, p. 52-54.
