= Richard B. Hetnarski =

Polish-born American academic (1928–2024)

- (Ryszard Bożysław Hetnarski)
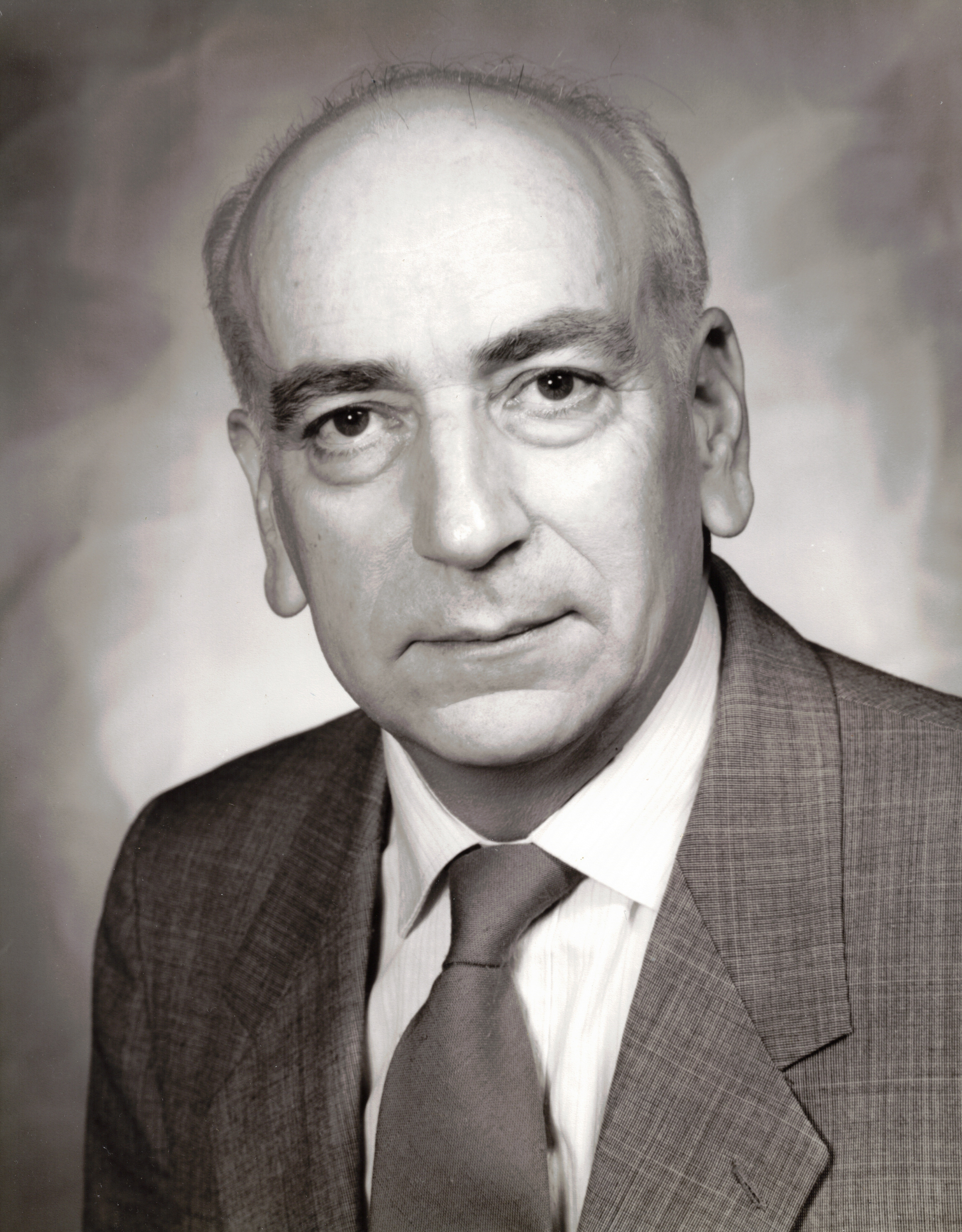
- Born: May 31, 1928; Stopnica, Poland
- Died: June 8, 2024 (aged 96); Naples, Florida, U.S.
- Citizenship: Polish, US naturalized
- Education: Gdańsk University of Technology; University of Warsaw; Polish Academy of Sciences
- Known for: Thermal Stresses Thermoelasticity
- Scientific career
- Fields: Solid Body Mechanics
- Workplaces: Institute of Fundamental Technological Research of the Polish Academy of Sciences; Columbia University; Northwestern University; Cornell University; Rochester Institute of Technology; NASA Lewis Research Center
- Thesis: On the Solution of Generalized Wave Equation in Problems of Coupled Thermoelasticity (1964)
- Doctoral advisor: Witold Nowacki; Henryk Zorski

Richard B. Hetnarski (May 31, 1928 – June 8, 2024) was a Polish-born American academic and translator who was a professor in the department of mechanical engineering at Rochester Institute of Technology. He was an ASME Fellow since 1983 and a New York State Licensed Professional Engineer since 1976. He is best known for his contributions to the fields of Thermal Stresses and Thermoelasticity.

== Early life and work ==
Richard B. Hetnarski was born in Stopnica, Poland. He received a Master of Science degree in mechanical engineering at Gdańsk University of Technology in Poland in 1952; an M.S. degree in mathematics at the University of Warsaw in 1960; and a Doctor of Technical Sciences degree at the Institute of Fundamental Technological Research of the Polish Academy of Sciences in Warsaw in 1964, mostly under the tutelage of Professor Witold Nowacki. In his career he concentrated his research on Solid Body Mechanics.

In Poland, he worked at the Institute of Aviation in Warsaw (1955–1959), and also at the Institute of Fundamental Technological Research of the Polish Academy of Sciences (1959–1969). In the years 1964–1965, he held post-doctorate fellowships at Columbia University in New York and at Northwestern University in Evanston, Illinois.

== Immigration to the United States ==
In 1969, Hetnarski and his family emigrated from Poland to the United States, and he became Visiting Associate Professor in the Department of Theoretical and Applied Mechanics at Cornell University in Ithaca, New York, for the year 1969–1970. He became a United States naturalized citizen in 1974. From 1970 until 1998, he held positions in the Department of mechanical engineering at Rochester Institute of Technology, first as New York State Science and Technology Foundation Distinguished Visiting Professor (1970–1971), then as Professor (1971–1992), and finally as James E. Gleason Professor (1992–1998). He became a professor emeritus in 1998.

In 1979, he held a summer faculty fellowship at the NASA Lewis Research Center in Cleveland, Ohio. Then, in September 1979, he taught a UNESCO sponsored course at the International Centre for Mechanical Sciences (CISM) in Udine, Italy. Subsequently, he became a NASA employee as an aeronautical engineer, and worked at NASA in Cleveland until the end of January 1980. Later, he spent five months as Visiting Professor at the University of Paderborn in Germany.

== Personal life ==
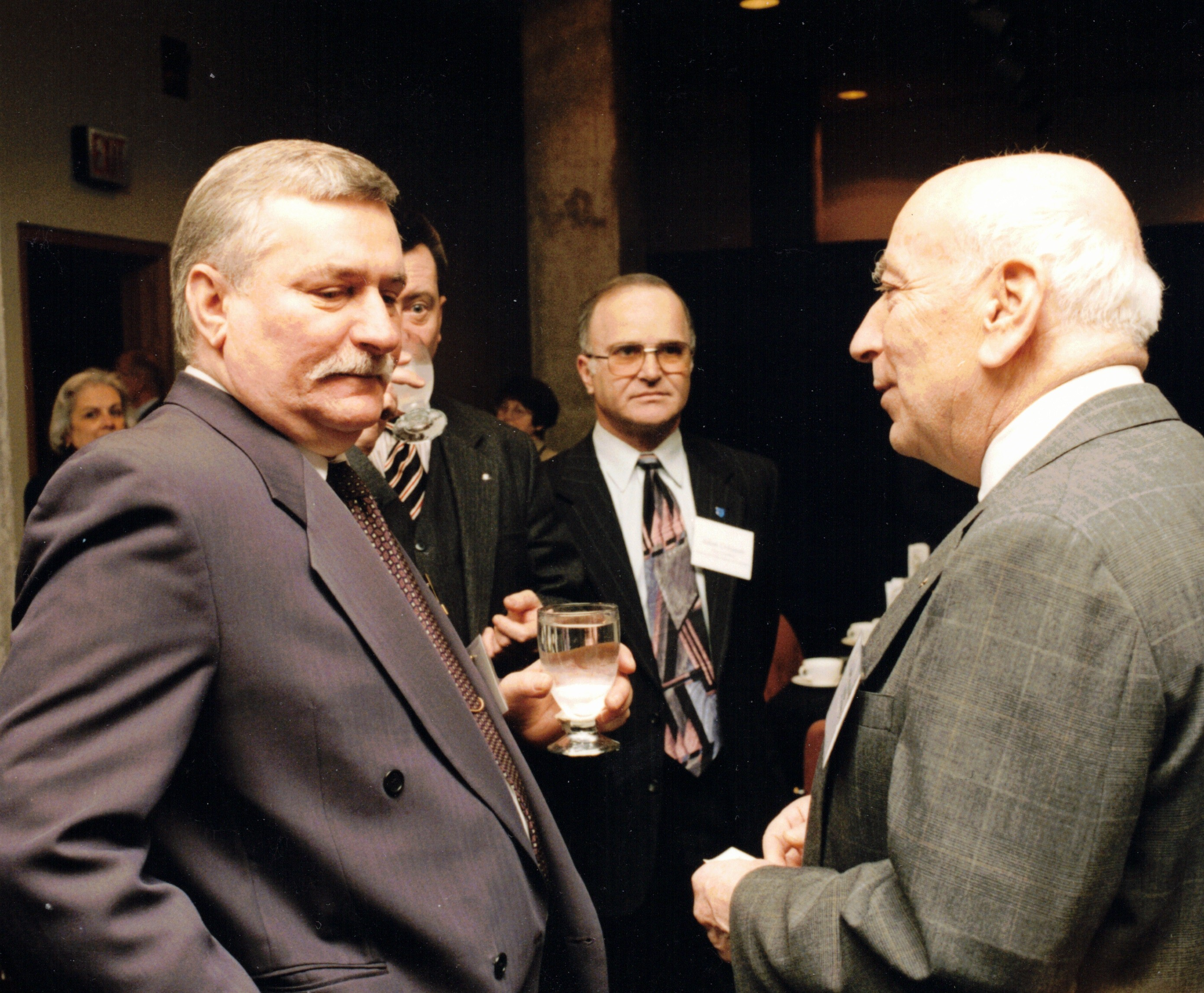
Lech Wałęsa, Nobel Peace Prize winner and former President of Poland and Richard B. Hetnarski in discussion at Rochester Institute of Technology 16 Feb 1998

Hetnarski was known for his deeply pro-democracy convictions. In 1989, when the Communist government in Poland was collapsing, he gave a number of presentations on the subject at three TV network affiliates of NBC, ABC, and CBS. When Lech Wałęsa, Nobel Peace Prize winner and former president of Poland, visited Rochester Institute of Technology in February 1998, he and Wałęsa discussed the political situation in Poland, later described in the Rochester Democrat and Chronicle, February 22, 1998 edition.

Hetnarski died in Naples, Florida, on June 8, 2024, at the age of 96.

== Achievements ==
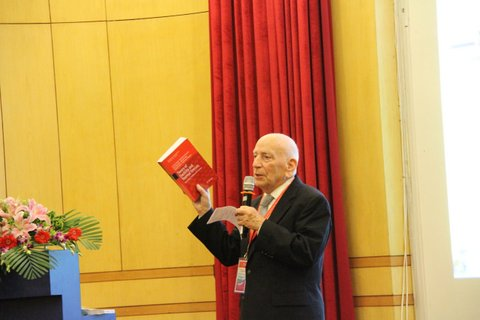
Professor Richard B. Hetnarski, at the opening ceremony of the 10th International Congress on Thermal Stresses in Nanjing, China, on 1 Jun 2013. He is presenting the book "Theory of Elasticity and Thermal Stresses" which just got published.

Hetnarski was the founder (with Naotake Noda) and president until 2020 of the International Congresses on Thermal Stresses (ICTS). These Congresses are held every two years consecutively on three continents, that is, in Asia, America, Europe. The first meeting was held June 5–7, 1995 in Hamamatsu, Japan at Shizuoka University and second was held June 8–11, 1997 in Rochester, New York, U.S. at Rochester Institute of Technology. These were titled First and Second International Symposium on Thermal Stresses and Related Topics, respectively. The name International Symposium on Thermal Stresses and Related Topics was changed to International Congress on Thermal Stresses with the meeting in Kraków, Poland at Cracow University of Technology on June 13–17, 1999. In 2002 the International Congresses on Thermal Stresses (ICTS) became an Affiliated Organization of International Union of Theoretical and Applied Mechanics (IUTAM).

Hetnarski was active in teaching, research, publishing, translating, and editing. He is the author of many papers on Mechanics and Mathematics. His latest paper, on Constant Force Spring System with a Spiral was published in the ASME Journal of Mechanisms and Robotics in 2020 when he was 92 years old.

== Books ==
Hetnarski was a co-author of five graduate-level textbooks:

- Thermal Stresses, by N. Noda, R.B. Hetnarski, and Y. Tanigawa, 2nd edition, Taylor & Francis, XIV+493 pages, 2003.
- The Mathematical Theory of Elasticity, by R.B. Hetnarski and J. Ignaczak, 2nd edition, CRC Press, XXXV+800 pages, 2010.
- Solutions Manual to accompany the book Mathematical Theory of Elasticity, by R.B. Hetnarski and J. Ignaczak, Taylor & Francis, New York, 2005, 160 pages.
- Thermal Stresses - Advanced Theory and Applications, by R.B. Hetnarski and M.R. Eslami, 2nd edition, Springer, XXXII+636 pages, 2019.
- Theory of Elasticity and Thermal Stresses – Explanations, Problems and Solutions, by M.R. Eslami, R.B. Hetnarski, J. Ignaczak, N. Noda, N. Sumi, and Y. Tanigawa, XVI+789 pages, Springer, 2013.

== Editor and translator work ==
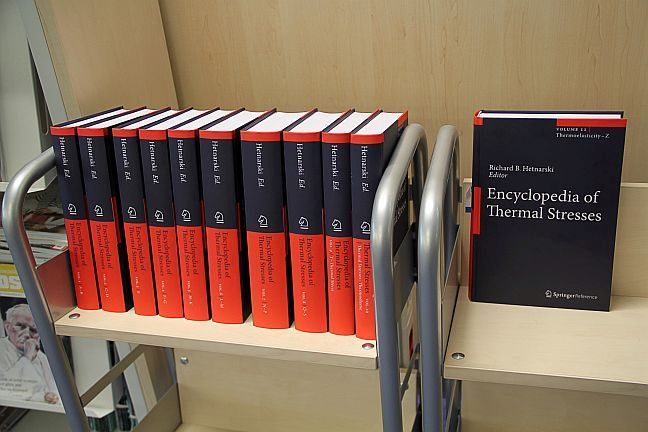
All 11 Volumes of the Encyclopedia of Thermal Stresses, 10 June 2014

In 1978, Hetnarski founded the Journal of Thermal Stresses, and he was its editor-in-chief for 40 years (1978–2018), and was later its Honorary Editor. He served (1988–1991) as an Associate Editor of Applied Mechanics Reviews.

He was Editor of the 11-volume Encyclopedia of Thermal Stresses, 6643 pages, Springer, 2014. Also, he was Editor of the five-volume Thermal Stresses handbook which was published by Elsevier in Amsterdam and by Lastran Corp. in Rochester, New York, in the years 1986–1999.

Hetnarski translated or co-translated three books into Polish from Russian, from German, and from English, and one from Russian into English. He edited five books on Mechanics.
