= Aleksander Welfe =

- Born: 5 August 1960 (age 66); Łódź
- Scientific career
- Fields: economics
- Workplaces: University of Łódź Warsaw School of Economics (SGH)

Aleksander Welfe (born 5 August 1960) is a professor of economics at the University of Łódź and the Warsaw School of Economics (SGH), and Vice President of the Polish Academy of Sciences in the 2023–2026 term. He has served as an advisor to the governor of the National Bank of Poland. Within the field of economics, he specializes in methods of analyzing time series and macromodeling.

== Career ==
He earned his master's degree in "economic cybernetics and IT" in 1982 from the University of Łódź, working under. Cezary Józefiak. He earned his doctorate (PhD) in 1985 from the University of Warsaw, submitting a thesis on "Analysis of the market of consumer goods under conditions of non-equillibrium", written under Leszek Zienkowski. He earned his higher doctorate (DSc or "habilitation") from the University of Economics in Wrocław in 1990. In 1996, he received the title of Full Professor from the President of Poland Aleksander Kwaśniewski.

He is currently employed as a professor of economics at both the University of Łódź and the Warsaw School of Economics (SGH).

On 22 November 2022 he was proposed by Marek Konarzewski, President-Elect of the Polish Academy of Sciences, as a candidate to become one of the academy's Vice Presidents. On 8 December, at a session of the General Assembly of the academy, he was elected to the office of Vice President of the Polish Academy of Sciences (together with three other Vice Presidents: Mirosława Ostrowska, Natalia Sobczak, and Dariusz Jemielniak.

== Selected academic publications ==
He has authored and co-authored more than 150 research publications, as well as more than a dozen books.

His book publications in English include the following:

- Principles of Macroeconometric Modeling. L.R. Klein, W. Welfe, A. Welfe. Elsevier, Amsterdam, 1999.
- New Directions in Macromodelling: Essays in Honor of J. Michael Finger, ed. Aleksander Welfe. Elsevier, 2005.

His academic papers in English include the following:

- Convergence-driven inflation and the channels of its absorption. Karolina Konopczak, Aleksander Welfe, Journal of Policy Modelling, 2017.
- Asymmetric Price Adjustments in the Fuel Market. Aleksander Welfe, Katarzyna Leszkiewicz-Kędzior. Central European Journal of Economic Modelling and Econometrics, 2014.
- A Risk-Driven approach to Exchange-Rate Modelling. Aleksander Welfe, Piotr Kębłowski/ Economic Modelling, Elsevier Science, 2012.
