= Carlberg =

Carlberg is a Swedish surname. Notable people with the surname include:

- Anders Carlberg (1943–2013), Swedish politician and writer
- Carl-Ehrenfried Carlberg (1889–1962), Swedish gymnast who competed in the 1912 Summer Olympics
- Carsten Carlberg (born 1963), German biochemist
- Elisabeth Rehn (born 1935) née Carlberg, Finnish politician
- Eric Carlberg (1880–1963), Swedish sport shooter, fencer, and modern pentathlete who competed in the four Olympics
- Gotthold Carlberg (1838–1881), German musician
- Kevin Carlberg (1977–2009), American musician
- Liliane Carlberg (1936–2024), Swedish television producer
- Norman Carlberg (born 1928), American sculptor and printmaker
- Pelle Carlberg (born 1969), Swedish singer/songwriter
- Peter Carlberg (born 1950), Swedish actor
- Roy Carlberg (1882–1975), American politician from Nebraska
- Sofia Karlberg (born 1996), Swedish singer
- Vilhelm Carlberg (1880–1970), Swedish sports shooter and Olympic Champion
