= George J. Weng =

Taiwanese professor in engineering science

- Citizenship: United States
- Alma mater: National Taiwan University (BS); Yale University (PhD)
- Institution: Rutgers University (Distinguished Professor)
- Honors: William Prager Medal (2013) Fellow, American Society of Mechanical Engineers (1991) Fellow, American Academy of Mechanics (1997)
- Expertise: Micromechanics, Composite materials, Nanocomposites, Solid mechanics
- Editorial: Editor, Acta Mechanica (1985–2020) Editor-in-Chief, ASME Journal of Engineering Materials and Technology (1992–1997)
- Doctoral Advisor: Aris Phillips (Aristoteles Philippidis)

George J. Weng is a Chinese-American scientist, a Distinguished Professor in the Department of Mechanical and Aerospace Engineering at Rutgers University. His expertise is in the field of solid mechanics. He made contributions to micromechanics, composite materials, multifunctional materials, and nanocomposites. His works carried a distinct connection between the micro-scale processes and the macro-scale phenomena of solids.

== Early life and education ==
Weng was born in Tainan, Taiwan in 1944. He went to National Taiwan University to study Mechanical Engineering, received a B.S. in 1967. In 1974, he received his Ph.D. from Yale University in Engineering and Applied Science under the supervision of Prof. Aris Phillips (Aristoteles Philippidis), with a dissertation titled "The Investigation of Yield Surface by Dislocation Mechanics".

== Career ==
He joined Rutgers University as an Assistant Professor in 1977, became an Associate Professor in 1980, a Full Professor in 1984, and a Distinguished Professor in 1992. Prior to that, he was awarded a Dutch Government Fellowship as a research fellow at Delft University of Technology (1973–1974). He also worked as a postdoctoral fellow at UCLA (1975–1976) and a research engineer at General Motors Research Laboratories (1976–1977).

His research has focused on several aspects of mechanical properties of materials, including dislocation mechanics, crystal plasticity, elastic properties of reinforced solids, and plasticity and phase transition of dual-phase materials. The works of Eshelby^{1} and Hashin-Shtrikman^{2} are known to have direct influence on his research. He has also worked on the functional properties of ferroelectric and multiferroic materials, their direct and converse effects, and electrical and thermal conductivity of carbon-nanotube and graphene based polymer nanocomposites. Weng is the author of many peer-reviewed journal articles. In addition to his journal publications, he has also published some book chapters and co-edited two books related to micromechanics and inhomogeneity, and micromechanics and nanomechanics of composite solids.

In recognition of his "outstanding research contributions in theoretical solid mechanics," Weng was awarded William Prager Medal in 2013 by the Society of Engineering Science. A 3-day, 55-paper symposium on Micromechanics, Composites, and Multifunctional Materials, was held in his honor during the Joint SES 50th Annual Technical Meeting and ASME Applied Mechanics Summer Conference at Brown University.

His professional activities included Editor of Acta Mechanica (1985–2020), Editor-in-Chief, Journal of Engineering Materials and Technology, Trans. of ASME (1992–1997), Chairman of ASME Materials Division (1993–1994), and an international appointee to the University of Hong Kong Visiting Research Professor Scheme (2010–2013).

== Honors and awards ==
- William Prager Medal, Society of Engineering Science (2013)
- Fellow, American Society of Mechanical Engineers (1991)
- Fellow, American Academy of Mechanics (1997)
