= Journal of Animal and Feed Sciences =

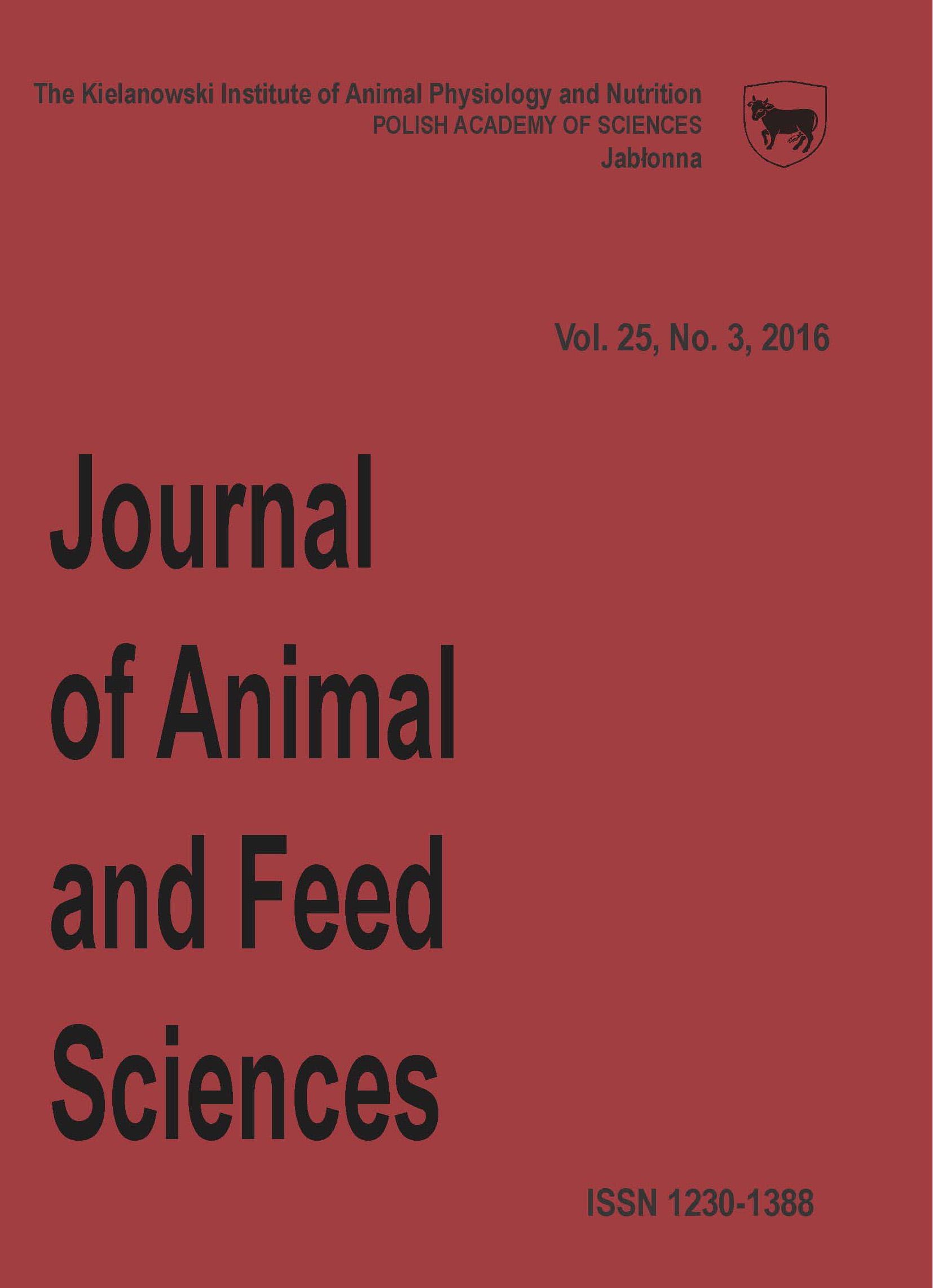
- Discipline: Agriculture, Agricultural sciences
- Language: English
- Edited by: Anna Antuszewicz

Publication details
- History: 1992–present
- Publisher: Kielanowski Institute of Animal Physiology and Nutrition (Poland)
- Frequency: Quarterly
- Open access: Yes
- Impact factor: 1.0 (2022)

Standard abbreviations
- ISO 4: J. Anim. Feed Sci.

Indexing
- CODEN: JFESEA
- ISSN: 1230-1388 (print); 2719-8448 (web)
- OCLC no.: 29354750

Links
- Journal homepage; Online archive

Journal of Animal and Feed Sciences is an open access peer-reviewed scientific journal of animal and agricultural science. The journal has been published by the Kielanowski Institute of Animal Physiology and Nutrition of the Polish Academy of Sciences (Jabłonna, Poland) since 1992. It continues the earlier Polish-language Roczniki nauk rolniczych. Seria B: Zootechniczna (OCLC 29654099). It publishes original papers, reviews and, occasionally, short papers on basic and applied research. The journal was edited by Jan Kowalczyk (1991–2013), Jacek Skomiał (2014–2020), Agata Krawczyńska (2021) and since 2022 is edited by Anna Antuszewicz.

== Abstracting and indexing ==
The journal is abstracted and indexed in:

- CAB Abstracts
- Current Contents (Life Sciences)
- Science Citation Index
- Food Science and Technology Abstracts
- Index Copernicus
- SCOPUS
- Cabell's International
- AGRO

According to the Journal Citation Reports, the journal has a 2020 impact factor of 1.0.
