= International Institute of Molecular Mechanisms and Machines, Polish Academy of Sciences =

An institute of Polish Academy of Sciences

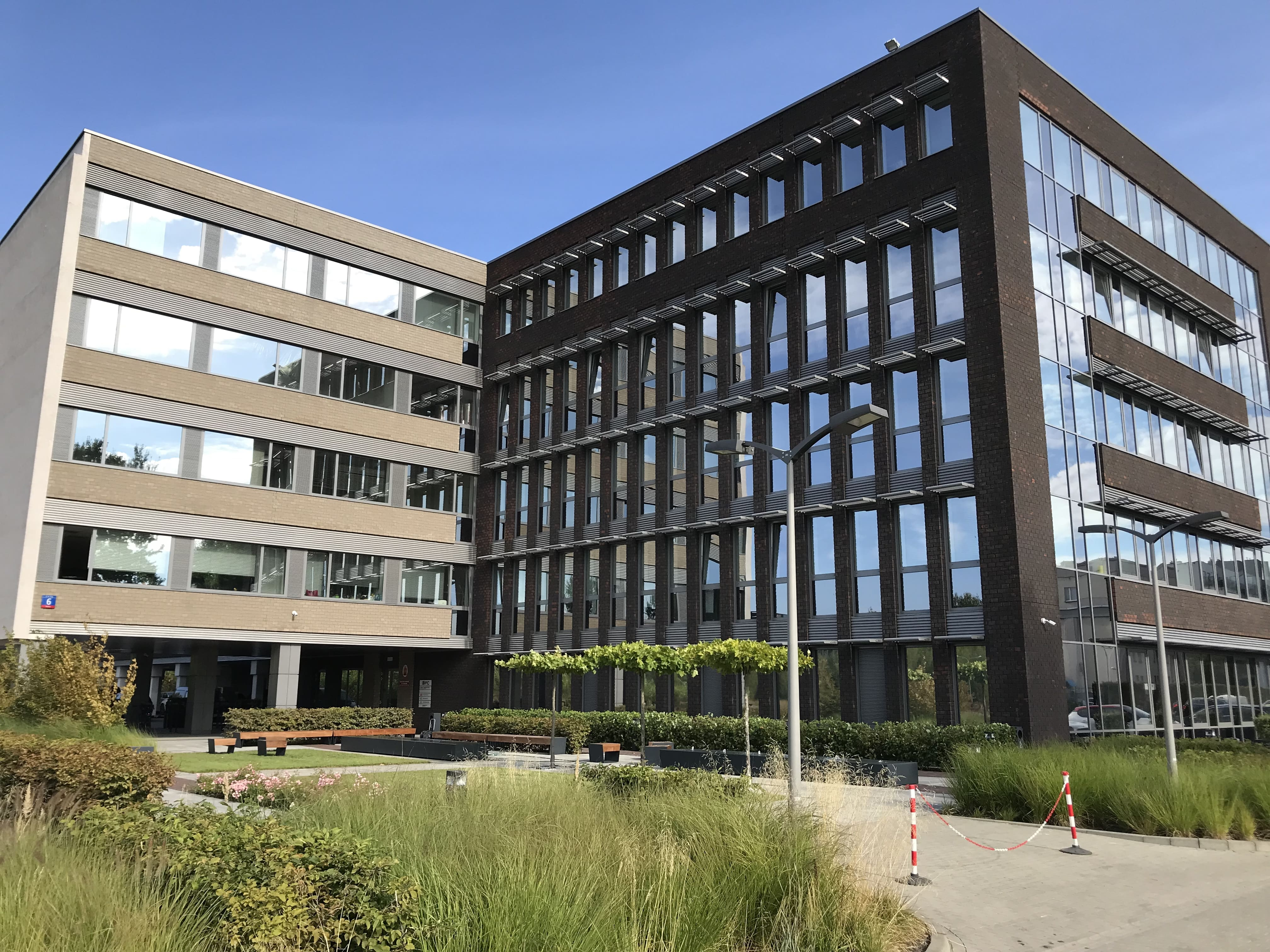
- Latin: International Institute of Molecular Mechanisms and Machines, Polish Academy of Sciences
- Established: 2020
- Head: Prof., D.Sc. Agnieszka Chacińska
- Location: 02-247, ul. Flisa 6, tel.:(+48) 607 435 448, Warsaw, Poland; 52.18926°N 20.95095°E
- Website: https://imol.institute/

International Institute of Molecular Mechanisms and Machines, Polish Academy of Sciences (IMol) is a research unit of the Polish Academy of Sciences located in Warsaw at 6 Flisa Street. It conducts basic and applied research in biological, biochemical, biomedical, and biotechnology sciences.

It was established in December 2020 and began scientific activity in mid-2021. It is the first newly established research institute of the Polish Academy of Sciences in over 25 years. It was created based on the International Research Agenda of the FNP "ReMedy" (Regenerative Mechanisms for Health). The project was led by Prof. Agnieszka Chacińska and Prof. Magda Konarska. In November 2022, IMol moved to its current building at ul. M. Flisa 6. In 2024, IMol joined BioForum - the Association of Biotechnology Companies. In 2026, Prof. Agnieszka Chacińska, the IMol's director, became the first recipient of the Polish Academy of Sciences award.

The international partners of IMol include the University Medical Center Göttingen and the Weizmann Institute of Science in Israel. Nearly 50% of IMol’s scientific team consists of foreign researchers from around the world. Among IMol's group leaders are members of EMBO, the German National Academy of Sciences Leopoldina, and the Federation of European Neuroscience Societies. From 2025, IMol actively participates in science outreach activities, such as Warsaw Science Festival and Scientific Picnic.

== Leadership ==
Executive Board (as of 2026)

- Director: prof. Agnieszka Chacińska
- Deputy Director for Science: prof. Magda Konarska
- Deputy Director for Development: Dr hab. Anna Marusiak
- Deputy Director for Administration: Radosław Jodzis
- Deputy Director for Commercial Strategy and Innovation: Dr Piotr Wierzchowiec
- Coordinator for Junior Researchers: Dr hab. Maciej Cieśla

Scientific Board (as of 2026)

- Chair of the Board: prof. Victor Ambros (recipient of the 2024 Nobel Prize in Physiology or Medicine)
- Vice Chair of the Board: prof. Witold Filipowicz
- Secretary of the Board: Prof. Zofia Szweykowska-Kulińska
- Board member: Prof. Agnieszka Chacińska
- Board member: Prof. Zofia Chrzanowska-Lightowlers
- Board member: Prof. Ehud Gazit
- Board member: Dr. Zdeněk Hostomský
- Board member: Prof. Stefan Jakobs
- Board member: Prof. Bożena Kamińska-Kaczmarek
- Board member: Prof. Jørgen Kjems
- Board member: Prof. Magda Konarska
- Board member: Prof. Reinhard Lührmann
- Board member: Prof. Nikolaus Pfanner
- Board member: Prof. Peter Rehling
- Board member: Prof. Piotr Siciński
- Board member: Prof. Grzegorz Węgrzyn
