= Sulgostowski =

Sulgostowski (feminine: Sulgostowska) is a Polish surname. May refer to:

- Antonina Dunin-Sulgostowska (1870–1940)
- Hieronim Dunin Sulgostowski
- Marcin Dunin Sulgostowski (1774–1842), archbishop of Poznań and Gniezno, primate of Poland
- Stanisław Dunin Sulgostowski
- Teresa Sulgostowska (1930–2015)
- Zofia Sulgostowska, Polish archaeologist
