= Mirosława Ostrowska =

- Born: 26 June 1960 (age 66)
- Citizenship: Polish
- Education: Gdańsk University of Technology Institute of Ocenoloogy, Polish Academy of Sciences
- Scientific career
- Fields: oceanology
- Workplaces: Institute of Ocenoloogy, Polish Academy of Sciences

Mirosława Małgorzata Ostrowska (born 26 June 1960) is a professor at the Institute of Oceanology, Polish Academy of Sciences, and Vice President of the Polish Academy of Sciences in the 2023–2026 term.

Within the field of oceanology, her research work focuses on the physics and optics of the sea and on modeling the environmental conditions of fluorescence and photosynthesis in the sea as indicators of changes in the environment. She has been a corresponding member of the Polish Academy of Sciences since 1999.

== Education ==
She graduated with a degree in telecommunications from the Gdańsk University of Technology in 1985. She earned her doctorate in oceanology (specifically in the physics of the sea and optics of the sea and atmosphere) from the Institute of Oceanology, Polish Academy of Sciences in 2000, with a dissertation entitled "Using Fluorescence Methods for Photosynthesis Investigation in the Sea). She then earned her higher doctorate (DSc or "habilitation") at the same Institute in 2013, in recognition of work on the fluorescence of phytoplankton in the seas and oceans.

== Career ==
Since the beginning of her scientific career, she has been employed at the Institute of Oceanology, Polish Academy of Sciences. There she has headed the Marine Biophysics Laboratory since 2015. She has served on the Research Council of the institute, and on the Presidium of the PAS Committee on Maritime Research.

Since 2016, she has also been the chairwoman of the Marine Physics Section of the Marine Research Committee of the Polish Academy of Sciences, where she was a member of the presidium from 2016 to 2020. She is also an expert of the Remote Sensing Section of the Committee on Space and Satellite Research of the Polish Academy of Sciences (since 2019) and a member of the presidium and chairwoman of the Marine Section of the Space Science Committee of the Gdańsk Branch of the Polish Academy of Sciences (since 2016).

She has played a leading role in the development and implementation of the SatBaltic System for Satellite Monitoring of the Baltic Sea Environment. Since 2015, she has been the coordinator of the SatBaltic Science Consortium, an interdisciplinary research team aimed at developing methods for studying and monitoring the Baltic Sea ecosystem.

She is the Chair of the Steering Committee of the Electronic Center for Oceanographic Data Sharing project eCUDO.pl implemented by a partnership of seven Polish scientific institutions with oceanographic data sets. She coordinates long-term activities aimed at the creation of the Polish Oceanographic Database and its integration into international structures. She has participated in numerous national and international marine and ocean research cruises, and has organized periodic scientific conferences.

On 22 November 2022 she was proposed by Marek Konarzewski, President-Elect of the Polish Academy of Sciences, as a candidate to become one of the academy's Vice Presidents. On 8 December, at a session of the General Assembly of the academy, she was elected to the office of Vice President of the Polish Academy of Sciences (together with three other Vice Presidents: Aleksander Welfe, Natalia Sobczak, and Dariusz Jemielniak.

== Selected academic publications ==
- Remote sensing of vertical phytoplankton pigment distributions in the Baltic: new mathematical expressions. Part 2: Accessory pigment distribution. R. Majchrowski, Joanna Stoń-Egiert, Mirosława Ostrowska, Bogdan Woźniak, D. Ficek, B. Lednicka, Jerzy Dera. Oceanologia, Polish Academy of Sciences, Institute of Oceanology, 2008
- Remote sensing of vertical phytoplankton pigment distributions in the Baltic: new mathematical expressions. Part 1: Total chlorophyll a distribution. R. Majchrowski, Bogdan Woźniak, D. Ficek, Jerzy Dera, M. Ostrowska, J. Stoń-Egiert. Oceanologia, Polish Academy of Sciences, Institute of Oceanology
- Quantum yield of photosynthesis in the Baltic: a new mathematical expression for remote sensing applications. Bogdan Woźniak, D. Ficek, R. Majchrowski, Jerzy Dera, M. Ostrowska. Oceanologia, Polish Academy of Sciences, Institute of Oceanology, 2008
- Algorithm for the remote sensing of the Baltic ecosystem (DESAMBEM). Part2: Empirical validation. Mirosław Darecki, Dariusz Ficek, Adam Krężel, Mirosława Ostrowska, Roman Majchrowski, Sławomir Woźniak, Katarzyna Bradtke, Jerzy Dera, Bogdan Woźniak. Oceanologia, Polish Academy of Sciences, Institute of Oceanology. 2008.
- Remote sensing of vertical phytoplankton pigment distributions in the BalticL new mathematical expressions PART 2: Accessory pigment distribution. R Majchrowski, J Stoń-Egiert, M Ostrowska, B Woźniak, D Ficek, J Dera. Oceanologia, Polish Academy of Sciences, Institute of Oceanology, 2007
- Photosynthesis quantum yield in the Baltic a new mathematical expression of remote sensing applications. B Woźniak, D Ficek, M Ostrowska, R Majchrowski, J Dera. Oceanologia, Polish Academy of Sciences, Institute of Oceanology, 2007.
- Remote sensing of vertical phytoplankton pigment distributions in the Baltic: new mathematical expressions PART 1Total chlorophyll a distribution. M Ostrowska, R Majchrowski, J Stoń-Egiert, B Woźniak, D Ficek, J Dera. Oceanologia, Polish Academy of Sciences, Institute of Oceanology, 2007
