= Martin Ostoja-Starzewski =

Professor of mechanical science and engineering

Martin Ostoja-Starzewski is a Polish-Canadian-American scientist and engineer, a Research Professor and Richard W. Kritzer Faculty Scholar of mechanical science and engineering at the University of Illinois Urbana-Champaign. His research includes work on deterministic, stochastic, and computational mechanics: random and fractal media, representative elementary volume in linear and nonlinear material systems, universal elastic anisotropy index, random fields, and bridging continuum mechanics to fluctuation theorem.

== Education and career ==
Ostoja-Starzewski is an immigrant to Canada and the United States from Poland. He received his undergraduate education at Cracow University of Technology, followed by Master’s and Ph.D. degrees at McGill University in 1980 and 1983, respectively. He worked as a faculty member at Purdue University, Michigan State University, Institute of Paper Science and Technology at Georgia Tech, McGill University, and (since 2006) at the University of Illinois Urbana-Champaign. He is also affiliated with the university's Beckman Institute and National Center for Supercomputing Applications. He was site co-director of the NSF Industry/University Cooperative Research Center for Novel High Voltage/Temperature Materials and Structures (2012-2022). In 2026, he was also a Professor of Computer Science at the Cracow University of Technology.

== Recognition ==
He serves as editor of Acta Mechanica, editor-in-chief of the Journal of Thermal Stresses, and chair managing editor of Mathematics and Mechanics of Complex Systems. He is Fellow of ASME, American Academy of Mechanics, Society of Engineering Science, and Associate Fellow of AIAA. His distinctions include Timoshenko Distinguished Visitor at Stanford University (2012), the Worcester Reed Warner Medal of ASME (2018), membership in European Academy of Sciences and Arts (2022), Academia Europaea (2023), Polish Academy of Sciences (2026), and Rothschild Distinguished Visiting Fellow at Isaac Newton Institute for Mathematical Sciences (2023).

== Books ==
1. D. Jeulin and M. Ostoja-Starzewski, Eds., Mechanics of Random and Multiscale Microstructures, CISM, Vol. 430, Springer, Wien-New York, 2001. ISBN 9783211836842 (print), 9783709127803 (online)
2. M. Ostoja-Starzewski, Microstructural Randomness and Scaling in Mechanics of Materials, CRC Press (2007). ISBN 9781584884170
3. J. Ignaczak and M. Ostoja-Starzewski, Thermoelasticity with Finite Wave Speeds, Oxford University Press (2009). ISBN 9780199541645
4. A. Malyarenko and M. Ostoja-Starzewski, Tensor-Valued Random Fields for Continuum Physics, Cambridge University Press (2019). ISBN 9781108429856
5. A. Malyarenko, M. Ostoja-Starzewski and A. Amiri-Hezaveh, Random Fields of Piezoelectricity and Piezomagnetism: Correlation Structures, Springer (2020).
