= Natalia Sobczak =

- Born: 21 April 1956 (age 69)
- Citizenship: Polish
- Scientific career
- Fields: Metallurgy, materials engineering
- Institutions: Institute of Metallurgy and Materials Science, Polish Academy of Sciences

Natalia Sobczak (born 21 April 1956) is a professor of materials engineering at the Institute of Metallurgy and Materials Science, Polish Academy of Sciences, and Vice President of the Polish Academy of Sciences in the 2023–2026 term. She specializes in the physicochemistry of metals and alloys, physical metallurgy and heat treatment, foundry engineering, and the practice and theory of metal composites.

== Education ==
She earned her master's degree (with distinction) from the Peter the Great St. Petersburg Polytechnic University in 1984, followed by her doctorate (PhD) from the same university in 1984. She earned her higher doctorate degree (DSc or "habilitation") in 2005 from the Institute of Metallurgy and Materials Science, Polish Academy of Sciences. In 2012, she received the title of Full Professor from the President of Poland.

== Professional career ==
Since 2019, Sobczak has been working at the Institute of Metallurgy and Materials Engineering of the Polish Academy of Sciences, where she is head of the Laboratory of Theory of Metallurgical Processes.

She has been professionally affiliated with the Foundry Institute in Kraków (in the Department of Physicochemistry of Metals and Alloys) from 2002 to 2007, with the Motor Transport Institute in Warsaw from 2007 to 2010, with the Foundry Institute in Kraków (this time in the Center for High-Temperature Research of Liquid Metals and Alloys) from 2007 to 2020, and with the Institute of Precision Mechanics in Warsaw.

The positions, functions, and memberships she holds include the following:

- Corresponding member of the Polish Academy of Sciences (since 2022),
- Chair of the Cast Metal Matrix Composites Working Group of the World Foundry Organization (since 2001),
- Member of the International Committees on High Temperature Capillarity (since 1994) and on Subsecond Thermophysics (since 2013),
- Polish representative on the executive committee of the Federation of European Materials Societies (2020-2023),
- Member of the Evaluation Team affiliated with the Polish Ministry of Science and Higher Education (2013-2014),
- Chair of the Disciplinary Committee affiliated with the Polish Ministry of Science and Higher Education (2015-2019),
- Deputy Chairman of the Working Group on National Smart Specializations KIS8 "Multifunctional materials and composites with advanced properties, including nanoprocesses and nanoproducts" at the Ministry of Development and Technology (since 2015).

She has led and worked on dozens of research projects, including as PI for projects funded by the European Space Agency (ESA), UNIDO-UNDP (UN), NSF&NAS (US), the M. Skłodowska-Curie Polish-American Fund, and group projects of two COST Actions (EC) and working groups in three projects funded by the European Commission (FP7, H2020).

On 22 November 2022 she was proposed by Marek Konarzewski, President-Elect of the Polish Academy of Sciences, as a candidate to become one of the academy's Vice Presidents. On 8 December, at a session of the General Assembly of the academy, she was elected to the office of Vice President of the Polish Academy of Sciences (together with three other Vice Presidents: Mirosława Ostrowska, Aleksander Welfe, and Dariusz Jemielniak.

== Academic publications ==
She has authored and co-authored more than 200 research articles, 38 book chapters, and nine books. She also holds 18 patents.

== Awards ==
Sobczak has received 37 national and international awards and honors, including five scientific journal awards for best publication of the year (including from the Journal of the American Ceramic Society, Journal of Materials Engineering and Performance).
