= Wanda Leopold =

Polish author, medical doctor and social science activist

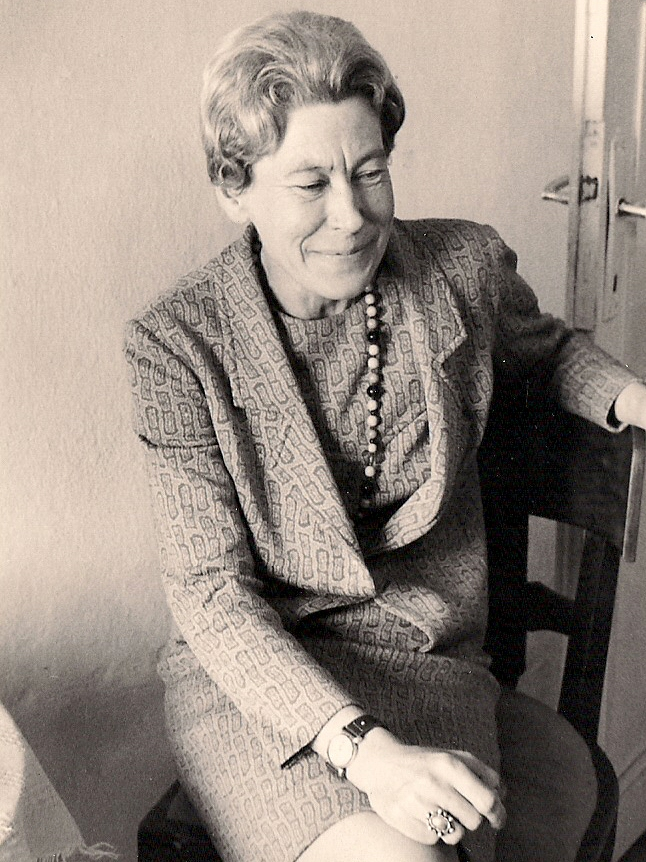
- Portrait of Wanda Leopold
- Born: Wanda Jadwiga Iwanowska; 13 October 1920; Warsaw
- Died: 8 October 1977 (aged 56); Gdańsk
- Occupations: Author and activist
- Spouse(s): Stanislaw Leopold, Kajetan Sosnowski
- Children: Joan (b. 1943 - d. 1945), Honorata (b. 1950), Martin (b. 1952)
- Father: George Ivanovski
- Relatives: Wacław Ivanovsky (unle); Tadeusz Ivanovo (Tadas Ivanauskas) (uncle)

Wanda Leopold (13 October 1920 – 8 October 1977) was a Polish author, medical doctor, and social science activist known for her study of English writings beginning in West Africa, specifically Nigeria. A translator as well as a literary critic, she stressed the artistic qualities of creative writing. She was a scholar of Polish culture, literature, and language. Her book O literaturze Czarnej Afryki (On The Literature of Black Africa) was the first Polish introduction to African literature that was written in both English, and French. Some of her first critical essays were on Chinua Achebe, Cyprian Ekwensi, and Wole Soyinka.

== Early life ==
Wanda Leopold was the daughter of George Ivanovski, who was a minister and senator of the Second Republic. Her uncles were: Belarusian social activist and politician Wacław Ivanovsky, Tadeusz Ivanovo (Tadas Ivanauskas), Professor of Biology at the University of Vilnius, Kaunas, and lawyer Stanislav Ivanovo. Her uncle was Bronisław Ziemięcki, pre-war minister and mayor of Lodz. In 1938, she graduated from high school and 'Jawurkówny Kowalczykówny' (i.e. School for Rural). In 1938–1939, she studied law at the University of Warsaw. While in school, she worked in the Association of Polish Democratic Youth, where she met her future husband, Stanislaw Leopold. During the war from 1940 to 1944, she began studying at the Faculty of Polish, a secret of the University of Warsaw. She befriended the then Tadeusz Borowski. She and Stanislaw went on to have one child, Joan (b. 1943 – d. 1945). During the Warsaw Uprising, her husband was killed commanding the first battalion on 28 August 1944. About a year later her daughter died. After returning to Warsaw, she met the painter, Kajetan Sosnowski. Later on, Leopold married Kajetan Sosnowski. They had two children, Honorata (b. 1950), and Martin - actor, director and poet (b. 1952).

== Career ==
Leopold was a member of the research staff for the Center of Social and Cultural Problems of Contemporary Africa, at the Polish Academy of Sciences. Unlike most of the other scholars who were in her field (linguists or anthropologists), she was a specialist in the history of literature and a literary critic. She specialized in the study of English writing, with a focus of West Africa (specifically Nigeria). Her first critical essays were focused on Chinua Achebe, Cyprian Ekwensi, and Wole Soyinka. After losing her husband and daughter, she began working at the Baltic Institute in Torun. Later, she returned to Warszaw and in 1946 she graduated from the Polish program at Warsaw University under the guidance of prof. Julian Krzyzanowski and began an assistantship at the Polish philology at the University of Breslau (1946–1948). Then, she later became an assistant in the Polish Department at Wrocław University. After returning to Warsaw she worked at the Institute of Literary Research (1948–1952). She published literary critiques, in the "Forge" and "New Culture," as well as writing 'radio plays' for children. In the editorial "Forge" she met painter Kajetan Sosnowski, whom she later married. In 1953, she joined the Polish Writers' Union.

== Major publications ==
- O literaturze Czarnej Afryki ("On the literature of Black Africa")

Written in Warsaw in 1973, this text included a detailed survey that illustrated the many inter-relations between African and European literatures.

- Antologia poezji afrykańskiej ("Anthology of African Poetry")

This anthology of African poetry offered a selection of many African poets who wrote in English, French, Portuguese, and Swahili. A major topic of discussion was the issue of cultural identity among African writers. The polish translations were also praised for their high artistic quality.

- Myślę, że jestem ... O Stanisławie Jerzym Lecu
- Jezyk i literatura Afryki Wschodniej ("Language and Literature of East Africa")

In this text, she emphasized the importance of artistry in creative and imaginative writing. She also discussed Swahili literary traditions.

- Drogi i manowce afrykanskiej literatury. Z badan nad problemami kszaltowanie sie swiadomosci kulturowej w niepodlegych krajach Czarnej Afryki ("Roads and Erratic Pathways of African Literature. Studies on the Rise of Culture Consciousness in the Independent Countries of Black Africa").
- Kolonializm Niemiecki w Kamerunie i Jego Wspolczesne Oceny ("German Colonialism in Cameroon and its Present-Day Appraisal")

In this text, she discussed the little-known period of German colonization of Cameroon and indigenous opposition to German colonialism led by the Cameroon citizens who had studied in Europe. It also includes an analysis of the problems of colonial education and its consequences today.

- Chinua Achebe i narodziny powiesci nigeryjskiej ("Chinua Achebe & The Rise of the Nigerian Novel")

This text discussed Chinua Achebe and some of his works.

- Wspolczesna powiesc nigeryjska--problemy kszaltowania sie nowej swiadomosci w pisarstwie Cypriana Ekwensi ("The Nigerian Social Novel: Problems in the Formation of a New Consciousness in Cyprian Ekwensi's Writings")
- Nigeryjski dramaturg--o tworczosci dramatycznej Wole Soyinka ("The Nigerian playwright: On Wole Soyinka's Dramatic Writings")

== Chart of contributors to African vernacular and literature ==
Name	Area of Study	Notable Works
Halina Bobrowska	French West Africa (Senegal)	"Powieski pisarzy Senegalu: Abdoulaye Sadji i Ousmana Sembene" (Novels by Senegalese writers: Abdoulaye Sadji and Ousmana Sembene, 1967)
Ernestyna Skurjat	African Studies	"Afryka w tworczosci jej pisarzy" (Africa in her writers' creations, 1973)
V. N. Vavilov	West Africa (Ghana, Nigeria)	"Literatura Gany" (The literature of Ghana, 1964)
F. M. Breskina	West African prose	"Nekotorye voprosy razvitija afrikanskix literatur" (Some questions on the development of African literatures, 1964)
S. P. Kartuzov	South Africa	"Literatura protesta v Juzno-afrikanskoj respublike" (Protest literature in the R.S.A., 1964)

== Known colleagues ==
- Tadeusz Borowski was a known colleague of Leopold. They knew each other from "wartime" classes. They worked on editing and researching texts together while they maintained a close friendship.
- Albert S. Gerard worked with Leopold on his published work, European-language Writing in Sub-Saharan Africa, before she died.

== Activism ==
In 1943, Leopold was a cyclist and a departure liaison to the whole country in the 6th division of the AK (Information and Propaganda Bureau of Domestic Distribution). Also, during the Warsaw Uprising, she fought and served as a liaison officer of the 6th division of the Home Army.

In February 1968, she participated in the meetings of the Warsaw branch of the Polish Writers Union concerning a protest against censorship by the picture played at the Warsaw National Theatre. The presentation of "Forefathers' Eve" directed by Kazimierz Dejmek was concerned.

Later, in 1975 she was a signatory of the letter protesting against changes in the constitution of PRL (Letter 59). Then, in 1976 she wrote a letter to the Parliament on the appointment of a commission to clarify the incidents of Radom and Ursus, as well as working with the Workers Defence Committee.
