= Harold Ramkissoon =

Trinidadian mathematician and fluid dynamicist (1942–2024)

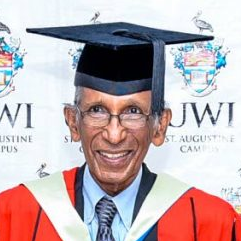
- Ramkissoon in 2019
- Born: 14 April 1942; Tabaquite, Trinidad and Tobago
- Died: 15 November 2024 (aged 82); Trinidad and Tobago
- Education: University of the West Indies; University of Toronto; University of Calgary
- Known for: Fluid Dynamics

Harold Ramkissoon (14 April 1942 – 15 November 2024) was a Trinidadian mathematician, academic, and science advocate known for his work in fluid dynamics. He served as Professor Emeritus of Mathematics at the University of the West Indies, and was an independent senator of the Parliament of Trinidad and Tobago.

== Early life and education ==
Harold Ramkissoon was born on 14 April 1942, in Tabaquite, Trinidad, and grew up in Marabella. He attended Tabaquite RC Primary School and later Presentation College. In 1966, he earned a Bachelor of Science degree in mathematics from the University of the West Indies (UWI). He completed a Master of Science in Mathematics at the University of Toronto in 1969 and a Ph.D. in applied mathematics at the University of Calgary in 1975. His doctoral research focused on fluid dynamics, including micropolar fluids, and marangoni instabilities.

In 2019, Ramkissoon received an honorary doctorate from the University of the West Indies and the Faculty of Science and Technology’s Lifetime Achievement Award.

== Career ==
Ramkissoon joined the University of the West Indies in 1976 as a lecturer in mathematics. He was promoted to senior lecturer in 1982, reader in mathematics in 1990, and, in 1998, became the first West Indian to be appointed to a personal chair in mathematics at UWI. He retired in 2007 and was named professor emeritus.

He collaborated with institutions such as Cambridge University, the Massachusetts Institute of Technology, Princeton University, and the Chinese Academy of Sciences. Ramkissoon authored over 85 peer-reviewed research papers and contributed to five books in applied mathematics.

Ramkissoon worked to advance science and technology in the Caribbean. He led the Caribbean Academy of Sciences (1994–1998) and the Caribbean Scientific Union (2002–2004). He founded the Caribbean Congress of Fluid Dynamics and chaired regional scientific conferences. In 2014, Ramkissoon was appointed Chair of the CARICOM Science and Technology (S&T) Committee, launched by Prime Minister Keith Mitchell of Grenada. From 2010 to 2013, he served as an independent senator in the Parliament of Trinidad and Tobago, advocating for policies supporting research and development. He also established the Trinidad and Tobago National Mathematics Olympiad to promote interest in mathematics and science among young people.

In 2017, Harold Ramkissoon launched his autobiography, My Journey, in Trinidad and then in Guyana through events organized by the University of the West Indies, the University of Guyana and the Ministry of Education.

Ramkissoon was a founding member and president of the Caribbean Academy of Sciences. He held executive roles in organizations such as the InterAcademy Partnership and the Academy of Sciences for the Developing World (TWAS). He participated in the Pugwash Conferences on Science and World Affairs, which received the Nobel Peace Prize in 1995, and was a fellow of the European Academy of Sciences and Arts. He was also a corresponding member of science academies in Cuba and Venezuela.

== Death and tributes ==
Ramkissoon died on 15 November 2024, at the age of 82. The Office of the President of Trinidad and Tobago and the Parliament of Trinidad and Tobago acknowledged his contributions and achievements on 26 November.

== Awards and recognition ==
Ramkissoon received several awards for his contributions to education, including the Chaconia Gold Medal in 2000, the Simón Bolívar Academic Gold Medal in 2001, and the Caricom Science Award in 2006. He was awarded honorary Doctor of Science degrees from the University of Technology, Jamaica, in 2011, and the University of the West Indies, St. Augustine, in 2019.

Ramkissoon was a recipient of fellowships from the Alexander von Humboldt Foundation and the Fulbright Foundation, and he was inducted into the CARISCIENCE Hall of Fame in 2015.

== Books ==
Ramkissoon’s published works include:

- Differential Equations (2011)
- The Element of Calculus (2010, with C. De Matas)
- Lubricated Transport of Viscous Materials (1998, editor), Kluwer Academic Publishers.
- Complex Analysis (1998, with B. Tom)
- Differential Complex Analysis (1996, with B. Tom)

== Selected papers ==
- "Drag on an Axially Symmetric Body in the Stokes' Flow of Micropolar Fluids" Authors: H. Ramkissoon and S.R. Majumdar, Physics of Fluids, vol. 19, pp. 16–21, 1976.
- "Representations in Hydrodynamics" Author: H. Ramkissoon, Acta Mechanica, vol. 28, pp. 49–53, 1977.
- "Potentials and Green's Functions in Micropolar Fluid Theory" Authors: H. Ramkissoon and S.R. Majumdar, Zeitschrift für Angewandte Mathematik und Mechanik (Z.A.M.M.), vol. 60, pp. 249–255, 1980.
- "Integral Representations in Hydrodynamics" Author: H. Ramkissoon, Acta Mechanica, vol. 50, pp. 119–125, 1983.
- "On a Planar Exterior Problem in Linear Elasticity" Author: H. Ramkissoon, Quarterly of Applied Mathematics, vol. 43, pp. 135–141, 1985.
- "Stokes Flow Past a Slightly Deformed Fluid Sphere" Author: H. Ramkissoon, Zeitschrift für Angewandte Mathematik und Physik (Z.A.M.P.), vol. 37, pp. 859–866, 1986.
- "Stokes Flow Past a Reiner-Rivlin Liquid Sphere" Author: H. Ramkissoon, Zeitschrift für Angewandte Mathematik und Mechanik (Z.A.M.M.), vol. 69, pp. 259–261, 1989.
- "Non-Newtonian Flow Between Concentric Cylinders" Authors: H. Ramkissoon and C.V. Easwaran, Zeitschrift für Angewandte Mathematik und Mechanik (Z.A.M.M.), vol. 72, 1993
- "Visco-Elastic Flow in Tubes Subjected to Pulses" Authors: H. Ramkissoon and S.R. Majumdar, International Journal of Engineering Science, vol. 33, pp. 217–221, 1995.
- "Stokes Flow Past a Non-Newtonian Spheroid" Author: H. Ramkissoon, Zeitschrift für Angewandte Mathematik und Mechanik, vol. 78, pp. 61–66, 1997.
- "Marangoni Instabilities in a Two-Layer Fluid System" Authors: H. Ramkissoon and D. Comissiong, Journal of Non-Equilibrium Thermodynamics, vol. 26, pp. 243–253, 2001.
- "On Thermal Instabilities in a Viscoelastic Fluid Subject to Internal Heat Generation" Authors: H. Ramkissoon, D. Comissiong, T. Dass, and A. Sankar, World Academy of Science, Engineering and Technology, vol. 80, pp. 826–833, 2011.

== Other publications ==
- "Science Research in the Caribbean" Authors: H. Ramkissoon, I. Kahwa, A World of Science, UNESCO, 2005.
- "Cuban Science: A Jewel in the Caribbean Crown" Authors: H. Ramkissoon, A World of Science, UNESCO, 2005.
- "Science and Technology in the Caribbean Today" Authors: H. Ramkissoon, Academi Sains Malaysia Monograph, 2007.
- "Challenges Facing the University in a Knowledge Economy" Authors: H. Ramkissoon, TWAS General Meeting, Mexico, 2008.
- "Transforming the Caribbean Science and Technology Landscape to Assist with Economic Development" Authors: H. Ramkissoon, 4th Annual Private Sector Meeting with CARICOM Ministers of Trade and Commerce, Jamaica, 2009.
- "The CARICOM Countries" Authors: H. Ramkissoon, I. Kahwa, UNESCO World Science Report, 2010.
- "The CARICOM Countries" Authors: H. Ramkissoon, I. Kahwa, UNESCO World Science Report, 2015.
