= Romuald Zabielski =

Polish veterinary scientist and professor

- Born: Romuald Zabielski; December 25, 1960 (age 65); Warsaw, Poland
- Education: Warsaw University of Life Sciences
- Occupation: Veterinary scientist

Romuald Zabielski (born 25 December 1960) is a Polish veterinary scientist and professor at the Warsaw University of Life Sciences. In 2019 he was appointed Vice President of the Polish Academy of Sciences.

He is a former director of the Kielanowski Institute of Animal Physiology and Nutrition in Jabłonna, Poland.

He has held the academic title of Full Professor since 2008, and has been a corresponding member of the Polish Academy of Sciences since 2013.

== Education and employment ==
Romuald Zabielski earned his degree as a doctor of veterinary medicine from the Warsaw University of Life Sciences in 1984. He earned his doctorate (PhD) in veterinary science in 1990, from the university's Faculty of Veterinary Medicine, and his higher doctorate (DSc) in 1995. He received the title of Full Professor (Poland's highest academic rank) from the President of Poland in 2004.

In 1999-2004 he led the Kielanowski Institute of Animal Physiology and Nutrition in Jabłonna, Poland. He has been a corresponding member of the Polish Academy of Sciences since 2013.

He has held a number of research fellowships abroad, prominently in Japan, including from Monbusho and JSPS in Japan (Rakuno Gakuen University oraz National Institute for Physiological Sciences, 1991–1994), but also from MESR in France (Institut national de la recherche agronomique, Rennes, 1996–1997) and STINT in Sweden (University of Lund, 1997–1998). He has been a visiting professor at Rakuno Gakuen University (Ebetsu, Japan), University of Bologna, Macquarie University (Sydney, Australia), Hokkaido University (Sapporo, Japan), the University of Shizuoka (Japan) and Nihon University (Fujisawa, Japan).

The posts he has previously held include:

- Director of the Kielanowski Institute of Animal Physiology and Nutrition in Jabłonna (1999-2003),
- Vice Dean for programs of study in foreign languages of the Faculty of Veterinary Medicine, Warsaw University of Life Sciences (2007-2016),
- Chairman of the Employee Evaluation Committee for Interfaculty Units of the Senate of the Warsaw University of Life Sciences (2008-2016),
- Vice President of the Polish Physiological Society (2008-2014),
- member of Poland's Research Unit Evaluation Committee (2013-2016),
- Chairman of the Council of Provosts of Division II—Biological and Agricultural Sciences, Polish Academy of Sciences (2015-2018).

In October 2018 he was elected by the General Assembly of the Polish Academy of Sciences to the post of Vice President of the Polish Academy of Sciences for the 2019-22 term.

== Research activity ==
Romuald Zabielski has promoted 10 doctorate students. Two of them won scholarships from the Foundation for Polish Science, one was Polish government scholarship holder from China, and one earned a double doctorate (cotutelle-de-these) under a partnership between the Warsaw University of Life Sciences in Warsaw and the University of Rennes, France.

He has published more than 200 research publications, including more than 160 listed by Journal Citation Reports. He is the editor / co-author of a number of monographs (including Biology in Growing Animals, volumes I-IV, published by Elsevier, Sterowanie rozwojem układu pokarmowego u nowo narodzonych ssaków, published by PWRiL, on digestive tract development in newborn animals, and the textbook Fizjologia noworodka z elementami patofizjologii, published by PWRiL).

His most important achievements include:

- describing the cyclical secretive and motor activity in the newborn digestive tract and the neurohormonal mechanisms of pancreatic secretion and motility of the stomach and intestines depending on intestinal hormones and vagus nerve,
- studying the developmental differences in the digestive tract of newborn piglets with Intrauterine Growth Restriction (IUGR),
- developing innovative feed supplements for farm animals (12 patents, including 2 EPO).

== Non-scientific activity ==
Zabielski is the author or co-author of a number of books and photography albums, including Moje Tatry and Duchy Tatr on the Tatra mountains in Poland, Japonia na nowo: po raz pierwszy odkryta – a guidebook to Japan, and Sakura in the Garden on Japanese cherry trees and related customs in Poland. He has had more than a dozen photographic exhibitions, including in Warsaw, Olsztyn, Kościelsk, and Zakopane. He is the initiator and co-organizer of the Japan Month at the Botanical Garden – Biodiversity Center managed by the Polish Academy of Sciences in Powsin on the outskirts of Warsaw.

== Awards and distinctions ==
Romuald Zabielski has received the following awards and distinctions:

- the Polish Prime Minister's Award for his DSc (habilitation) thesis (1996),
- the Award of the Chairman of Division V of the Polish Academy of Sciences (1999, 2004)
- the Award of the Rector of the Warsaw University of Life Sciences (1989, 1990, 2004, 2007, 2008, 2009, 2012)
- the Award of the Polish Society of Veterinary Sciences (1990, 2008)
- the Silver Medal for Longstanding Service (2008)
- the Medal of the Committee of National Education (2009)
- the distinction "Person of Merit for the Warsaw University of Life Sciences" (2008)
- the Silver Medal for Innovation (Seul 2009)
- the Award of the Polish Minister of Science and Higher Education (2012)
- the Napoleon Cybulski Medal of the Polish Physiological Society (2014).
