= Witold Filipowicz =

Polish-Swiss biochemist and molecular biologist

- Born: 8 August 1943 (age 83); Warsaw,Poland
- Citizenship: Polish, Swiss
- Education: Medical University of Lodz, Poland
- Scientific career
- Fields: biochemistry, molecular biology
- Workplaces: Institute of Biochemistry and Biophysics, Warsaw, Friedrich Miescher Institute for Biomedical Research, Basel

Witold Filipowicz (born August 8, 1943 in Warsaw, Poland) - Polish-Swiss biochemist and molecular biologist.

== Biography ==
Filipowicz studied at the Faculty of Medicine of the Medical University of Lodz. He received his PhD and habilitation at the Institute of Biochemistry and Biophysics of the Polish Academy of Sciences (PAS) in Warsaw. This was followed by the post-doctoral studies at the New York University Medical School and Roche Institute of Molecular Biology in Nutley, NJ (laboratories of Severo Ochoa and Aaron J. Shatkin). Since 1984, he has been the head of the laboratory at the Friedrich Miescher Institute for Biomedical Research in Basel, Switzerland (currently emeritus). Since 1991, Professor of Biological Sciences at PAN, and since 1997, Professor (now emeritus) of the University of Basel. He has trained over 50 PhD students and post-doctoral scholars.

== Research ==
Research of Filipowicz has focused on the mechanisms of maturation and function of different classes of RNA molecules and ribonucleoprotein particles (RNPs), enzymes involved in RNA metabolism, mechanisms of protein synthesis, and mechanisms of RNA interference (RNAi) and microRNA (miRNA) function in mammalian cells. Filipowicz has more than 47,000 citations on Google Scholar.

== Selected awards and honors ==
- The Lifetime Achievement in Science Award of the RNA Society (2011).
- Gutenberg Chair Award (Chaire Gutenberg) 2013, Strasbourg.
- Member of European Molecular Biology Organization (EMBO) (since 1994).
- Member of Academia Europaea (since 2005); Chair of the Section of Biochemistry and Molecular Biology of Academia Europaea (2013-2021).
- Foreign member, The Polish Academy of Sciences (since 2005).
- Membership in Scientific Advisory Boards of different institutions, including: The Institute of Molecular Mechanisms and Machines, Polish Academy of Sciences (IMol) (since 2022); National Center of Competence in Research (NCCR) “RNA and Disease”, Bern, Switzerland (since 2014); Max-Planck Institute for Developmental Biology, Tübingen (2008-2018) and Max-Planck Institute of Biophysical Chemistry/MPI-Nat, Göttingen (2018-2024)
- Membership in Editorial Boards of different scientific journals, including RNA (since 1997), RNA Biology (since 2004), and Cell (2008-2016).

== Selected publications ==
- Filipowicz, W.; Furuichi, Y.; Sierra, J.M.; Muthukrishnan, S.; Shatkin, A.J.; Ochoa, S. (1976). "A protein binding the methylated 5'-terminal sequence, m7GpppN, of eukaryotic messenger RNA". Proceedings of the National Academy of Sciences. 73 (5): 1559–1563. doi:10.1073/pnas.73.5.1559. ISSN 0027-8424. PMC 430337. PMID 1064023.
- Konarska, M.; Filipowicz, W.; Domdey, H.; Gross, H.J. (1981). "Formation of a 2′-phosphomonoester, 3′,5′-phosphodiester linkage by a novel RNA ligase in wheat germ". Nature. 293 (5828): 112–116. Bibcode:1981Natur.293..112K. doi:10.1038/293112a0. ISSN 0028-0836. PMID 7266664.
- Filipowicz, W.; Shatkin, A.J. (1983). "Origin of splice junction phosphate in tRNAs processed by HeLa cell extract". Cell. 32 (2): 547–557. doi:10.1016/0092-8674(83)90474-9. PMID 6186399.
- Goodall, GJ; Filipowicz, W. (1989). "The AU-rich sequences present in the introns of plant nuclear pre-mRNAs are required for splicing". Cell. 58 (3): 473–483. doi:10.1016/0092-8674(89)90428-5. PMID 2758463.
- Kiss, T.; Filipowicz, W. (1995). "Exonucleolytic processing of small nucleolar RNAs from pre-mRNA introns". Genes & Development. 9 (11): 1411–1424. doi:10.1101/gad.9.11.1411. ISSN 0890-9369. PMID 7797080.
- Waibel, F.; Filipowicz, W. (1990). "RNA-polymerase specificity of transcription of Arabidopsis U snRNA genes determined by promoter element spacing". Nature. 346 (6280): 199–202. doi:10.1038/346199a0. ISSN 0028-0836. PMID 2366873.
- Kiss, T.; Marshallsay, C.; Filipowicz, W. (1991). "Alteration of the RNA polymerase specificity of U3 snRNA genes during evolution and in vitro". Cell. 65 (3): 517–526. doi:10.1016/0092-8674(91)90469-f. PMID 1826860.
- Zhang, H.; Kolb, FA; Jaskiewicz, L.; Westhof, E.; Filipowicz, W. (2004). "Single Processing Center Models for Human Dicer and Bacterial RNase III". Cell. 118 (1): 57–68. doi:10.1016/j.cell.2004.06.017. PMID 15242644.
- Pillai, RS; Bhattacharyya, SN; Artus, CG; Zoller, T.; Cougot, N.; Basyuk, E.; Bertrand, E.; Filipowicz, W. (2005). "Inhibition of translational initiation by Let-7 MicroRNA in human cells". Science. 309 (5740): 1573–1576. doi:10.1126/science.1115079. ISSN 0036-8075. PMID 16081698.
- Bhattacharyya, SN; Habermacher, R.; Martine, U.; Closs, EI; Filipowicz, W. (2006). "Relief of microRNA-mediated translational repression in human cells subjected to stress". Cell. 125 (6): 1111–1124. doi:10.1016/j.cell.2006.04.031. PMID 16777601.
- Mathys, H.; Basquin, J.; Ozgur, S.; Czarnocki-Cieciura, M.; Bonneau, F.; Aartse, A.; Dziembowski, A.; Nowotny, M.; Conti, E.; Filipowicz, W. (2014). "Structural and biochemical insights to the role of the CCR4-NOT complex and DDX6 ATPase in microRNA repression". Molecular Cell. 54 (5): 751–765. doi:10.1016/j.molcel.2014.03.036. PMID 24768538.
- Krol, J.; Busskamp, V.; Markiewicz, I.; Stadler, MB; Ribi, S.; Richter, J.; Duebel, J.; Bicker, S.; Fehling, HJ; Schübeler, D.; Oertner, TG; Schratt, G.; Bibel, M.; Roska, B.; Filipowicz, W. (2010). "Characterizing light-regulated retinal microRNAs reveals rapid turnover as a common property of neuronal microRNAs". Cell. 141 (4): 618–631. doi:10.1016/j.cell.2010.03.039. PMID 20478254.
- Krol, J.; Krol, I.; Alvarez, CP; Fiscella, M.; Hierlemann, A.; Roska, B.; Filipowicz, W. (2015). "A network comprising short and long noncoding RNAs and RNA helicase controls mouse retina architecture". Nature Communications. 6 (1): 7305. doi:10.1038/ncomms8305. ISSN 2041-1723. PMC 4468907. PMID 26041499.
