= Zenon Mariak =

Polish neurosurgeon, researcher, and professor of medicine

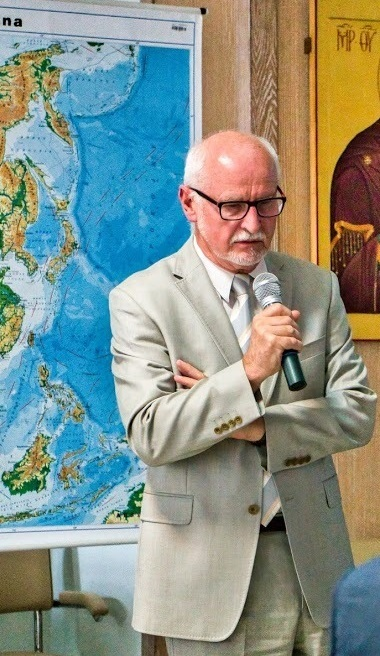
- Citizenship: Polish
- Education: Medical University of Bialystok (MD, PhD)
- Scientific career
- Workplaces: Medical University of Bialystok

Zenon Mariak is a Polish neurosurgeon, researcher, and professor who is currently head of the Department of Neurosurgery at the Medical University of Białystok. He previously served as the Deputy President of the Medical University of Białystok. He is a member of the Committee of Neurological Sciences at the 5th Faculty of Medical Sciences of the Polish Academy of Sciences.

== Education ==
Mariak was awarded an MD at the Medical University of Białystok. He obtained his Ph.D. in 1995 from the Medical University of Białystok. Since August 2021, Mariak has served on the Council of Health Needs as a representative of the Podlaskie Province.

== Research ==
His research career began in 1978, when he contributed to findings in intracranial pressure, rheoencephalography, and cerebral circulation. From 1984 to 1986, his research focused on neurological complications in the field of ophthalmology such as histological changes in the sclera in retinal detachment and cataract extraction. Until 2008, Mariak published in the American Journal of Roentgenology, European Journal of Ophthalmology, Polish Neurology and Neurology Journal, Ophthalmology Journal, Neurology Psychiatry and Brain Research, and the European Journal of Applied Physiology in topics such as intracranial aneurysms, brain temperature control, intensive neurosurgical care, cognitive dysfunction, and injuries of cranial nerves II-VII. Mariak has explored the revival of psychosurgery, commenting that deep brain stimulation is successful in minimizing negative consequences of neuropsychological disorders. Mariak is a medical contributor on Polish news network TVP3, most recently discussing epileptic events and visual disturbances. Mariak's works have been cited 886 times in medical research.
