= Kielanowski Institute of Animal Physiology and Nutrition of the Polish Academy of Sciences =

Polish research institute

Kielanowski Institute of Animal Physiology and Nutrition
- Instytut Fizjologii i Żywienia Zwierząt im. Jana Kielanowskiego Polskiej Akademii Nauk
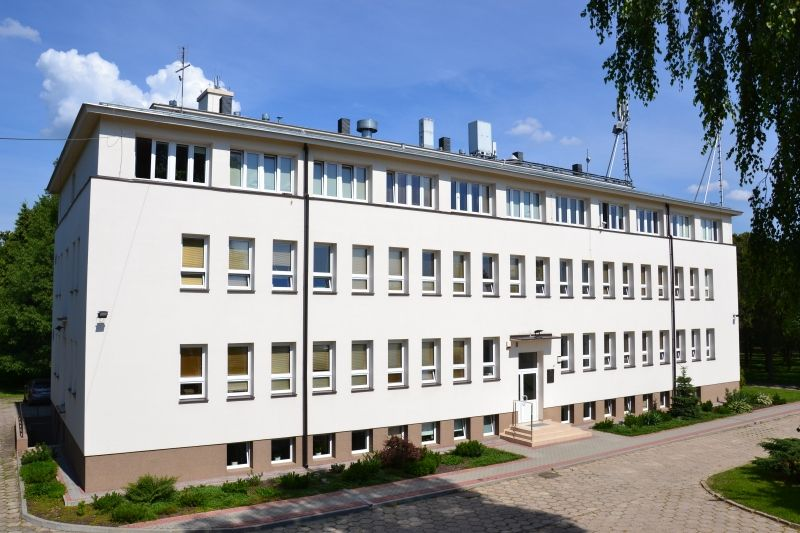
- The main building of the institute
- Type: scientific institute
- Established: 1955
- Founder: Jan Kielanowski
- Parent institution: Polish Academy of Sciences
- Director: Andrzej Herman
- Location: Instytucka 3, Jabłonna, 05-110, Poland
- Website: ifzz.pl/en/
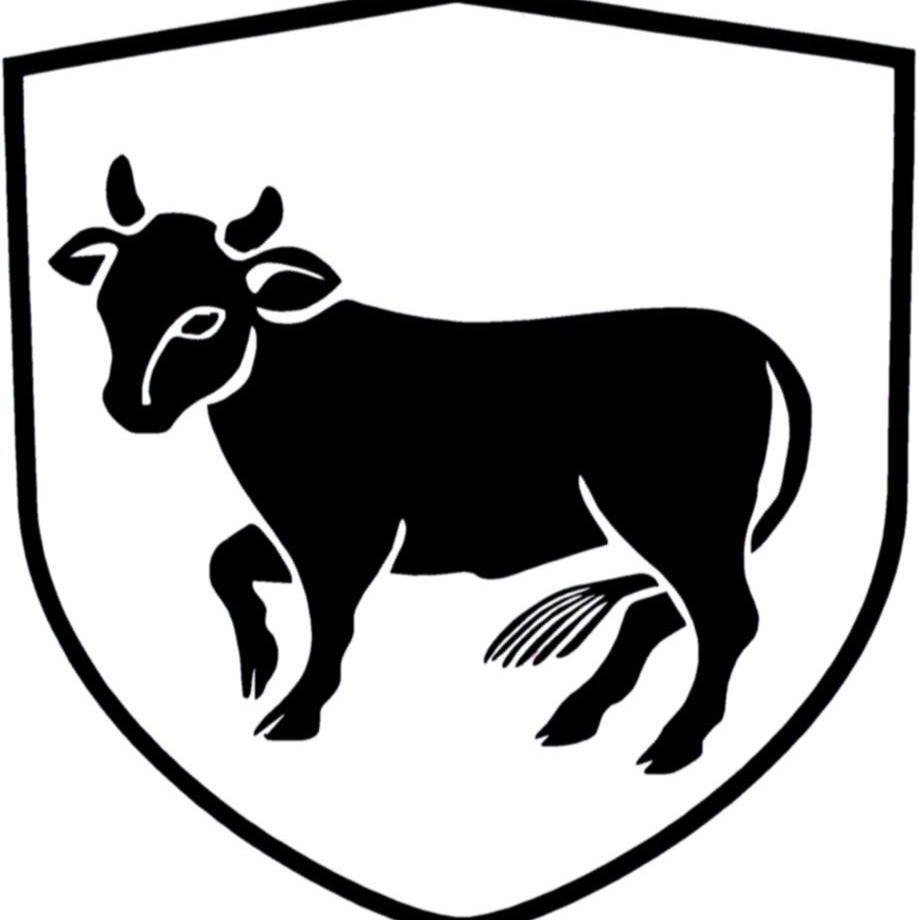

The Kielanowski Institute of Animal Physiology and Nutrition is a Polish agricultural research organization in Jabłonna, near Warsaw, Poland. It is part of the Polish Academy of Sciences. It publishes a journal, Journal of Animal and Feed Sciences, and monographs on various topics.

== History ==
The institute was established in 1955 to conduct scientific research into the physiology and nutrition of farm animals. The founder of the institute and its first director was Jan Kielanowski, whose name was given to the institute in 1990.

Institute directors:

- Jan Kielanowski (1955–1974)
- Stanisław Buraczewski (1974–1986)
- Bernard Barcikowski (1987–1990)
- Teresa Żebrowska (1990–1999)
- Romuald Zabielski (1999–2003)
- Jacek Skomiał (2003–2011, 2015–2019)
- Tomasz Misztal (2011–2015)
- Andrzej Herman (2019–
