= Acta Asiatica Varsoviensia =

- Discipline: Humanities, Social Science, Political Studies
- Language: English
- Edited by: Małgorzata Wielińska-Soltwedel

Publication details
- History: 1988–present
- Publisher: Institute of Mediterranean and Oriental Cultures, Polish Academy of Sciences (Poland)
- Frequency: Yearly
- Open access: Yes

Standard abbreviations
- ISO 4: Acta Asiat. Vars.

Indexing
- ISSN: 0860-6102 (print); 2449-8653 (web)

Links
- Journal homepage; Online access; Online archives

Acta Asiatica Varsoviensia is an academic journal published by the Institute of Mediterranean and Oriental Cultures of the Polish Academy of Sciences (until 2010 the Centre for Studies on Non-European Countries). Initially the journal was published in the Polish language, with article summaries written in English. Since the 13th issue, the journal was published in English, with occasional articles in French and German.

The journal is issued since the year 1988. The position of the chief editor between the years 1988 and 2014 was occupied by professor Roman Sławiński. In the year 2015, the chief editor was professor Jerzy Zdanowski. During the year 2016, the chief editor of the journal was professor Krzysztof Trzciński. The editor-in-chief is Małgorzata Wielińska-Soltwedel.

The journal was initially published by Wydawnictwo Naukowe Semper. The issues 11-28 were released by Wydawnictwo Naukowe Askon. Since the volume 29 (2016), the journal has been published by Polish Academy of Sciences and Cultivate Foundation.

== Abstracting and indexing ==
The journal is abstracted and indexed in:

- Scopus
- Worldwide Political Science Abstracts
- Historical Abstracts
- SCImago
- Directory of Open Access Journals
