= Bernard Zabłocki =

Polish microbiologist and immunologist

Bernard Zabłocki (January 1, 1907 in Navahrudak – March 3, 2002 in Delta, British Columbia) was a Polish microbiologist and immunologist. He was a professor at the University of Łódź (since 1950) and a member of the Polish Academy of Sciences (since 1965). Notable works include Bakterie i wirusy chorobotwórcze człowieka (1966) and Podstawy współczesnej immunologii (1973).
