= Zofia Hilczer-Kurnatowska =

Polish archaeologist (1932–2013)

Zofia Hilczer-Kurnatowska (1932 – 11 August 2013) was a Polish archaeologist. In 1982, Hilczer-Kurnatowska received the title of professor of humanities. Her main area of research was the archeology of Early Middle Ages. She was a member of the Polish Academy of Sciences. In 1993, Hilczer-Kurnatowska was awarded the Knight's Cross of the Order of Polonia Restituta.

== Select publications ==
- Ostrogi polskie z X-XIII w. (1953)
- Dorzecze górnej i środkowej Obry od VI do początków XI w. (1967)
- Słowiańszczyzna południowa (1973)
- Początki Polski (2002)
