= Jerzy Duszyński (biochemist) =

Polish biochemist, President of Polish Academy of Sciences

- Born: Jerzy Duszyński; March 6, 1949 (age 77); Warsaw, Poland
- Education: University of Warsaw
- Occupation: biochemist
- Known for: research on cell physiology, mitochondrial and neurodegenerative diseases

Jerzy Duszyński (Polish pronunciation: [ˈjɛʐɨ duˈʂɨj̃skʲi]; born 6 March 1949) is a Polish biochemist and professor of biological sciences. From 2015 to 2022 he was President of the Polish Academy of Sciences.

He is a former director of the Nencki Institute of Experimental Biology of the Polish Academy of Sciences (2003–08), a former Polish deputy minister of science (2008–09), and a former Dean of Division II—Biological Sciences of the Polish Academy of Sciences (2011–14).

He has held the academic title of Full Professor since 1993, has been a corresponding member of the Polish Academy of Sciences since 2007, and a member of Academia Europaea since 2007.

== Education and career ==
Jerzy Duszyński earned his undergraduate degree in biology from the Faculty of Biology and Earth Sciences at the University of Warsaw. He earned his doctorate (PhD) in biology in 1975, followed by his higher doctorate (DSc) in 1983, both at the Nencki Institute of Experimental Biology of the Polish Academy of Sciences. He received the title of Full Professor (Poland's highest academic rank) from the President of Poland in 1993.

He specialises in various issues related to biochemistry, including bioenergetics, the role of mitochondria in cell physiology, mitochondrial and neurodegenerative diseases. He heads the Laboratory of Bioenergetics and Biomembranes at the Nencki Institute of Experimental Biology of the Polish Academy of Sciences. He has held research fellowships in the United States (3.5 years, including at University of Pennsylvania and at Penn State University) and in France (1 year, including in Grenoble).

The course of his scientific career has been closely linked to the Nencki Institute of Experimental Biology, where he held the posts of Secretary of the Scientific Council (1990–92), Chairman of the Scientific Council (1996-2001), Deputy Director for Research Affairs (2002–03), and Director (2003-08). Additionally, within the Polish Academy of Sciences, he has served as the Dean of Division II—Biological and Agricultural Sciences and a member of the PAS Presidium (for the 2011-2014 term).

On 19 March 2015 he was elected President of the Polish Academy of Sciences for the 2015–2018 term. In October 2018, he was reelected for a second term (2019–2022).

== Research activity ==
Duszyński has published more than a dozen articles in top-level research journals. He is a member of Academia Europaea, a foreign member of the Chinese Academy of Sciences, a member of the board of Trustees of the Institute for Research in Biomedicine in Barcelona, and a board member of the Science and Technology in Society (STS) Forum in Japan.

Some of his research achievements include:

- The first experimental demonstration of substrate channeling and distinct intracellular microcompartments in the living cell, features which produce abnormal diffusion of metabolites within the cell as well as influence transport across the plasma membrane.
- The first quantification of the controlling weight of adenine nucleotide transport in cellular bioenergetics.
- Quantification of the energy capacities of major elements of the mitochondrial oxidative phosphorylation system.
- Discovery of the pH sensitivity of calcium entry into mammalian cells (the calcium concentration within the cell serves as a regulating factor; when elevated, it usually activates many cellular processes).
- The discovery that PML protein regulates the interaction of mitochondria and the endoplasmic reticulum and influences the intracellular calcium metabolism.
- The description of a method for isolating subcellular preparations that reflect the interaction between organelles and the plasma membrane.

== Non-scientific activity ==
During the years 1980-1985, Jerzy Duszyńsi was the chairman of the "Solidarity" trade union at the Institute of Experimental Biology. He has served as chairman of the City Council in the town of Podkowa Leśna (1989–93) and one of the founders of the Science Festival School Foundation. From 2008 to 2009, he held the post of deputy minister responsible for science at the Polish Ministry of Science and Higher Education.

== Awards and distinctions ==
Duszynski has been decorated with a Knight's Cross of the Polonia Restituta Order.
