= Archives of Acoustics =

Scientific journal

- Discipline: Acoustics
- Language: English
- Edited by: Andrzej Nowicki

Publication details
- History: 1976–present
- Publisher: Polish Academy of Sciences (Poland)
- Frequency: Quarterly
- Open access: Yes
- Impact factor: 1.1 (2025)

Standard abbreviations
- ISO 4: Arch. Acoust.

Indexing
- CODEN: AACODN
- ISSN: 0137-5075 (print); 2300-262X (web)

Links
- Journal homepage; Online archive

Archives of Acoustics is a peer-reviewed and diamond open access scientific journal published quarterly by Polish Academy of Sciences. Established in 1976, the journal covers research on acoustics. In January 2023, the journal discontinued its print edition to reduce environmental impact, becoming an exclusively online-only publication. Its current editor-in-chief is Andrzej Nowicki (Polish Academy of Sciences).

== Abstracting and indexing ==
The journal is abstracted and indexed in:

- Directory of Open Access Journals
- EBSCO databases
- Ei Compendex
- Inspec
- Linguistic Bibliography
- ProQuest databases
- Science Citation Index Expanded
- Scopus
- zbMATH Open

According to the Journal Citation Reports, the journal has a 2025 impact factor of 1.1.
