= Stanisław Zagaja =

- Born: 11 May 1925; Szczurowa, Poland
- Died: 17 December 2004 (aged 79); Skierniewice, Poland

Academic work
- Discipline: Botany
- Sub-discipline: Pomology
- Institutions: Research Institute of Pomology and Floriculture

Stanisław Wojciech Zagaja (Polish pronunciation: [staˈɲis.waf zaˈɡa.ja]; 11 May 1925 in Szczurowa, Poland – 17 December 2004 in Skierniewice, Poland) was a Polish pomologist, grower of orchard plants. Professor (since 1963) and director (since 1984) of the Research Institute of Pomology and Floriculture in Skierniewice, member of Polish Academy of Sciences since 1983.

His research was focused on fruit tree breeding, selection and seed physiology as well as working with apple vegetative rootstocks, and hybrids of peach and cherry.

== Books ==
- Zagaja, Stanisław (1975). Uprawa wiśni: instrukcja uprawowa do umowy kontraktacyjnej (in Polish) (1st ed.). Warsaw: Zakład Wydawnictw CRS. OCLC 749207922.
