= Witold Nowacki =

Polish mathematician (1911–1986)

Prof Witold Nowacki HFRSE PPAS (1911–1986) was a Polish mathematician and expert on the mechanics of elasticity and thermoelasticity. He served as President of the Polish Academy of Sciences from 1978 to 1980 and was the first President of the Society of the Interaction of Mathematics and Mechanics.

== Life ==
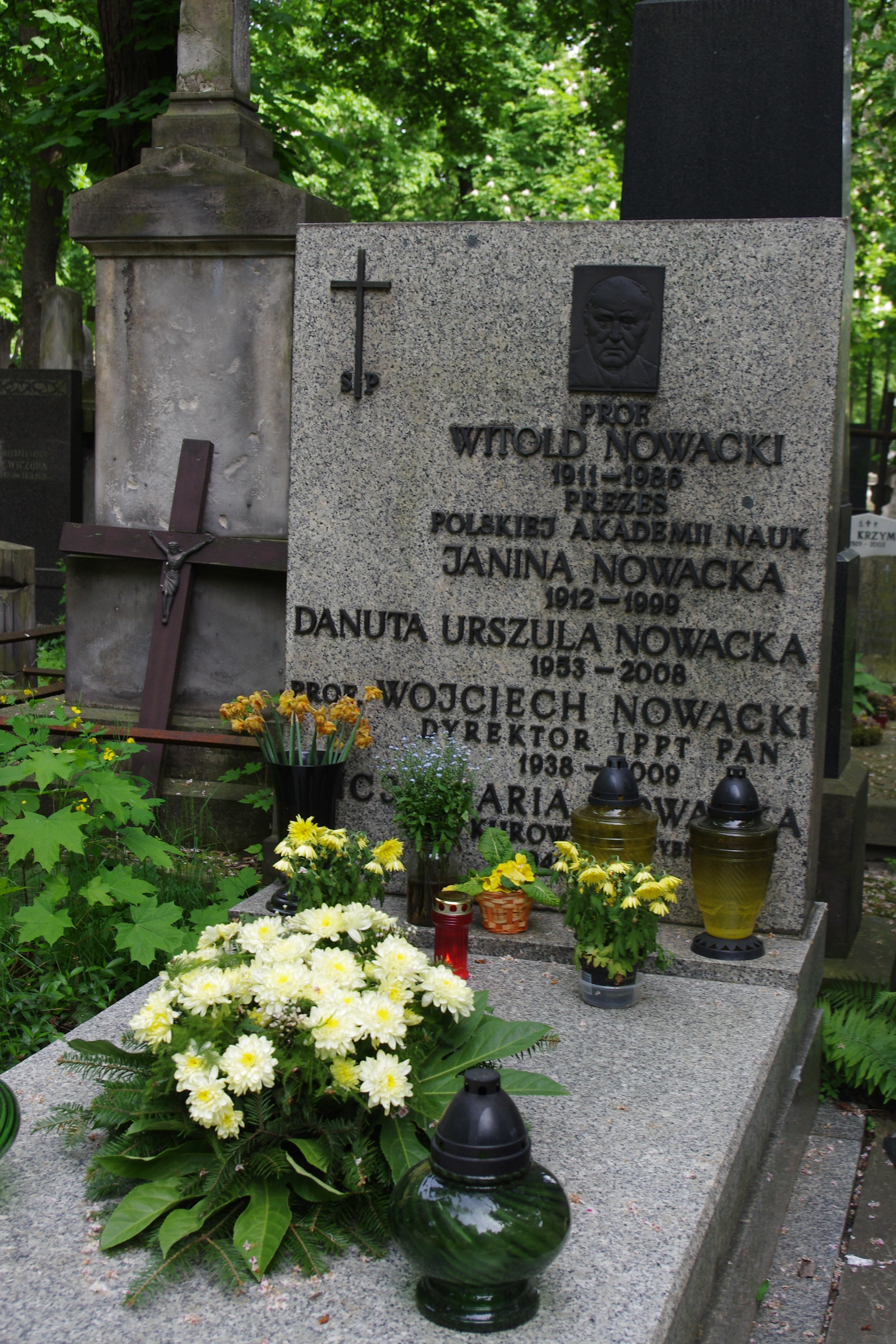
The grave of Witold Nowacki in Warsaw

Nowacki was born in Zakrzewo in Poland on 20 July 1911, the son of Ludwik Nowacki and his wife, Bronislawa Czyzewska.

He studied at Gdańsk Polytechnic graduating in 1934.

In the Second World War he served as an officer in the Polish Army but was captured in 1939 and spent the entire war as a German prisoner of war. In 1945 he was accepted as a Professor at Gdańsk University of Technology lecturing in the Strength of Materials. In 1952 he transferred to Warsaw Polytechnic lecturing in Building Mechanics and from 1955 taught Elasticity and Plasticity at Warsaw University. In 1979 he was elected an Honorary Fellow of the Royal Society of Edinburgh.

Nowacki retired in 1980.

== Personal life ==
In 1936, Nowacki married Janina Sztabianka. On 23 August 1986, Nowacki died in Warsaw, Poland.

== Publications ==
- Thermoelasticity (1962)
- Dynamics of Elastic Systems (1963)
- Theory of Micropolar Elasticity (1970)
- Trends in Elasticity and Thermoelasticity (1971)
- Autobiographical Notes (1985)
- Theory of Asymmetric Elasticity (1986)
