= Zofia Sulgostowska =

Polish archaeologist

- Born: 13 June 1944
- Died: February 12, 2023; Warsaw
- Citizenship: Poland
- Education: Uniwersytet Warszawski
- Awards: Cross of Merit (Poland)
- Honours: Cross of Merit (Poland)
- Scientific career
- Fields: Archaeology
- Workplaces: Institut of Archeology and Ethnology PAN
- Thesis: (14-06-1983)

Zofia Antonina Sulgostowska (13 June 1944 – 12 February 2023) was a Polish archaeologist, specialising in the archaeology of the Late Palaeolithic and Mesolithic periods around the Baltic Sea and Eastern Europe.

== Biography ==
In 1968, Sulgostowska graduated in history and archaeology from the University of Warsaw, on 14 June 1983, she defended her doctoral thesis. On 16 November 2006, she habilitated on the basis of the thesis entitled Contacts of Late Palaeolithic and Mesolithic communities between the Odra, the Dvina and the upper Dniester. The study of the distribution of siliceous rock products (PL: Kontakty społeczności późnopaleolitycznych i mezolitycznych między Odrą, Dźwiną i górnym Dniestrem. Studium dystrybucji wytworów ze skał krzemionkowych).

In 1986, she was employed as an associate professor at the then Institute of the History of Material Culture of the Polish Academy of Sciences and was secretary of the Committee of Pre- and Protohistoric Sciences of the Polish Academy of Sciences. From 1990 to 2011, she headed the Stone Age Department. Then, from 2012 to 2013, she headed the Centre for Interdisciplinary Archaeological Research at the same institute.

== Selected publications ==
- Zofia Sulgostowska, Małgorzata Winiarska-Kabacińska. 2005. Kontakty społeczności późnopaleolitycznych i mezolitycznych między Odrą, Dźwiną i górnym Dniestrem: studium dystrybucji wytworów ze skał krzemionkowych, Warszawa: Instytut Archeologii i Etnologii Polskiej Akademii Nauk
- Zofia Sulgostowska. 1989. Prahistoria międzyrzecza Wisły, Niemna i Dniestru u schyłku plejstocenu, Warszawa: Państwowe Wydawnictwo Naukowe.

== Awards ==
- Goldern Cross of Merit (Poland) (2015)
