= Journal of Thermal Stresses =

- Discipline: Materials science
- Language: English
- Edited by: Martin Ostoja-Starzewski

Publication details
- History: 1978–present
- Publisher: Taylor & Francis
- Frequency: Monthly
- Impact factor: 3.280 (2020)

Standard abbreviations
- ISO 4: J. Therm. Stress.

Indexing
- ISSN: 0149-5739 (print); 1521-074X (web)

Links
- Journal homepage

The Journal of Thermal Stresses is a monthly peer-reviewed scientific journal covering the theoretical and industrial applications of thermal stresses. It is published by Taylor & Francis. The journal was established in 1978 with Richard B. Hetnarski (Rochester Institute of Technology) as founding editor-in-chief. In July 2018 he was succeeded by Martin Ostoja-Starzewski (University of Illinois at Urbana-Champaign).

== Abstracting and indexing ==
The journal is abstracted and indexed in:

- CSA databases
- Current Contents/Engineering, Computing, & Technology
- Science Citation Index

According to the Journal Citation Reports, the journal has a 2020 impact factor of 3.28.
