= Carsten Carlberg =

German biochemist

- Born: December 13, 1963 (age 62); Hamburg, Germany
- Education: Free University of Berlin
- Known for: Research in nuclear hormone signaling & Vitamin D
- Scientific career
- Fields: Nutrigenomics
- Workplaces: Institute of Animal Reproduction and Food Research, Olsztyn
- Doctoral advisor: Burghardt Wittig

Carsten Carlberg (born December 13, 1963), is a German biochemist. He is professor of nutrigenomics at the Institute of Animal Reproduction and Food Research of the Polish Academy of Sciences in Olsztyn, Poland.

== Biography ==
Born in Hamburg, Germany, Carlberg completed his secondary education in Bremen, Germany, graduating in 1981 with Abitur at the Gymnasium an der Bördestrasse. From 1982 to 1987, he pursued studies in physics and biochemistry at the Free University of Berlin, Germany, earning a diploma in biochemistry. Thereafter, under the mentorship of Burghardt Wittig, in 1989 he obtained his Dr. rer. nat. PhD focusing on the interaction between polymerases and DNA secondary structures.

Between 1989 and 1992, Carlberg conducted postdoctoral research with Willi Hunziker at Hoffmann-La Roche in Basel, Switzerland, initiating his exploration into Vitamin D gene regulation. From 1992 to 1997, he continued this research in the Dermatology Department at the University of Geneva under Jean-Hilaire Saurat concentrating on gene regulation mediated by nuclear receptors. In 1997, he achieved his Habilitation at the University of Düsseldorf, Germany, while leading a research group in Helmut Sies´s Department of Physiological Chemistry.

In 2000, Carlberg was appointed as a full professor of biochemistry at the University of Kuopio, which in 2010 became part of the University of Eastern Finland. From 2006 to 2011, he held a concurrent position at the University of Luxembourg, where he established a Master's program in Integrated Systems Biology. Since 2022, he has been serving as the ERA Chair in Nutrigenomics at the Institute of Animal Reproduction and Food Research of the Polish Academy of Sciences in Olsztyn, Poland.

== Work and publications ==
Carlberg's research centers on gene regulation and epigenetics, with a particular emphasis on vitamin D. His work has significantly advanced the understanding of nuclear receptor signaling pathways and their implications in health and disease. He has authored over 300 publications listed in the Science Citation Index, which have been cited more than 14,000 times, resulting in an h-index of 66. Throughout his career, Carlberg has supervised 32 MSc students, 24 doctoral students and 16 postdoctoral fellows. He has also authored several textbooks, including Mechanisms of Gene Regulation, Nutrigenomics, Human Epigenomics, Cancer Biology, Molecular Immunology, Molecular Medicine, and Aging, reflecting his teaching and research expertise.

== Honors and awards ==
- 1987-1989: Thesis grant from the Fonds der Chemischen Industrie
- 2000: Habilitation prize from the Medical Faculty of the University of Düsseldorf
- 2006–2009: Coordinator of the EU-funded Marie Curie Research Training Network ("NucSys")
- 2021: Silver Badge of Honor from the Federation of Finnish Learned Societies
- 2021–2024: Visiting Professor at the Department of Nutrition, University of Oslo, Norway

== Selected publications ==
- Two nuclear signalling pathways for vitamin D, Nature (1993).
- The human peroxisome proliferator-activated receptor δ gene is a primary target of 1α,25-dihydroxyvitamin D3 and its nuclear receptor, Journal of Molecular Biology (2005).
- Vitamin D receptor signaling mechanisms: integrated actions of a well-defined transcription factor, Steroids (2013).
- An update on vitamin D signaling and cancer, Seminars in Cancer Biology (2022).
