= Gotthold Carlberg =

- Born: 13 June 1838; Berlin
- Died: 27 April 1881 (aged 42); New York City
- Occupation: Conductor

Gotthold Carlberg (1838–1881) was a German musical editor of Staats-Zeitung, a conductor of Russian concerts and leader of a number of and symphony concerts, all of which took place in New York City.

== Biography ==
Carlberg was born in Berlin, Germany on June 13, 1838. In 1857 he came to New York City and became the musical editor of the Staats-Zeitung. In 1861 he returned to Europe and served eight months in the Prussian Army, when he was honorably discharged on account of sickness. In 1871 he returned to the United States, having been engaged by Prince George Galitzin to conduct a series of Russian concerts. During the season of 1878–1879 he was the leader of a number of symphony concerts in Chickering Hall, New York. He died in New York, April 27, 1881.
