= Aristoteles Philippidis =

Aristoteles Iraklis Philippidis (known as Aris Phillips, 1915–1985) was a scholar in the field of applied mechanics, and made contributions to the mechanics of materials, especially to the theory of plasticity.

He was born in Smyrna. He graduated from the Praktikon Lykeum Athens in 1932 and got Diploma Engineering degree from the National Technical University of Athens. He went to the Technische Hochschule in Berlin-Charlottenburg in 1938 and made his doctoral study under the supervision of Georg Hamel. In 1939, he got his doctor degree.

He then conducted post-doctoral research at the Ludwig-Maximilians-Universität München (LMU) in 1940 and at Technische Hochschule München from 1940 to 1945.

In 1947, he went to the United States and taught at the California Institute of Technology and at Stanford University. Later he became a professor at Yale University, until his death.

He was the founder and co-editor of Acta Mechanica.
