= Acta Mechanica =

- Discipline: Fluid mechanics Solid mechanics
- Language: English
- Edited by: H. Irschik

Publication details
- History: 1965–present
- Publisher: Springer, Vienna
- Frequency: Monthly
- Open access: Hybrid
- Impact factor: 2.3 (2023)

Standard abbreviations
- ISO 4: Acta Mech.

Indexing
- ISSN: 1619-6937
- OCLC no.: 41171363

Links
- Journal homepage; Online access

Acta Mechanica is a peer-reviewed English, scientific journal publishing articles in the field of theoretical and applied mechanics, specifically in solid mechanics and fluid mechanics, published by Springer. The editor-in-chief is Hans Irschik (Johannes Kepler University Linz). Other Editors are M. Krommer (Vienna University of Technology), C. Marchioli (University of Udine), Martin Ostoja-Starzewski (University of Illinois at Urbana-Champaign), and George J. Weng (Rutgers University).

== Abstracting and indexing ==
The journal is abstracted and indexed in:

- Current Contents/Engineering, Computing & Technology
- Science Citation Index
- Scopus

According to the Journal Citation Reports, the journal has a 2021 impact factor of 2.645.

== See also ==
- Aristoteles Philippidis
