= Kajetan Sosnowski =

Polish abstract painter

Kajetan Sosnowski (1913–1987) was a Polish abstract painter.
