= Marek Konarzewski =

Polish biologist (born 1961)

- Born: 18 June 1961 (age 64)
- Citizenship: Polish
- Occupation: Biologist

Marek Konarzewski (Polish pronunciation: [ma.rɛk kɔnaʐɛvski]; born 18 June 1961 in Białystok) – professor of biology, popular-science author, faculty member at the University of Białystok, and corresponding member of the Polish Academy of Sciences. Since October 2022, President-Elect of the Polish Academy of Sciences.

== Background ==
Marek Konarzewski earned his master's in biology (MS) at what was then the University of Warsaw's branch campus in Białystok (now the University of Białystok). He earned both his doctorate (PhD) in 1990 followed by his higher doctorate degree (DSc) in 1996 at the Institute of Ecology, Polish Academy of Sciences – the latter based on a thesis entitled Allocation of Energy to Growth and Respiration in Avian Postembryonic Development. In 2004 he was awarded the academic title of Professor of Biological Sciences.

== Positions ==
Konarzewski is a professor at the Department of Evolutionary and Physiological Ecology, University of Białystok, and at the Faculty of Artes Liberales, University of Warsaw. In 1991–1993 he was a post-doc researcher at the University of California, Los Angeles (UCLA), at the lab of the prominent American biologist, geographer, and historian Jared M. Diamond. Since 2010 he has been a Corresponding Member of the Polish Academy of Sciences. In 2008–2013 he held the post of Minister-Counselor for Science and Technology at the Embassy of the Republic of Poland to the United States of America. In 2017–2021 he served as Science and Technology Advisor to the Polish Minister of Foreign Affairs. On 20 October 2022, he was elected by the General Assembly of the Polish Academy of Sciences to become the new President of the Academy for the 2023–2026 term (and will assume the office upon being appointed by the Prime Minister).

== Research Achievements ==
Konarzewski's research work focuses on physiological ecology and the emerging field of evolutionary physiology (of birds and mammals). He is the author or co-author of several dozen research publications; several of the most prominent are as follows:

- Konarzewski, Marek; Diamond, Jared (1995). "EVOLUTION OF BASAL METABOLIC RATE AND ORGAN MASSES IN LABORATORY MICE". Evolution. 49 (6). Wiley: 1239–1248. doi:10.1111/j.1558-5646.1995.tb04450.x. ISSN 0014-3820.
- Kozłowski, J.; Konarzewski, M.; Gawelczyk, A. T. (13 November 2003). "Cell size as a link between noncoding DNA and metabolic rate scaling". Proceedings of the National Academy of Sciences. 100 (24). Proceedings of the National Academy of Sciences: 14080–14085. doi:10.1073/pnas.2334605100. ISSN 0027-8424. PMC 283549.
- "Is West, Brown and Enquist's Model of Allometric Scaling Mathematically Correct and Biologically Relevant?" (co-author: J. Kozłowski), Functional Ecology, 18, 2004;
- "Artificial Selection on Metabolic Rates and Related Traits in Rodents" (co-authors: A. Książek, I. B. Łapo), Integrative and Comparative Biology, 45, 2005;
- Gębczyński, A. K.; Konarzewski, M. (June 2009). "Locomotor activity of mice divergently selected for basal metabolic rate: a test of hypotheses on the evolution of endothermy". Journal of Evolutionary Biology. 22 (6): 1212–1220. doi:10.1111/j.1420-9101.2009.01734.x.

By 2014, he had served as the thesis advisor for six PhD students.

== Science Communication ==
Konarzewski has also published numerous popular-science articles, the popular-science book Na początku był głód ["In the Beginning There Was Famine"], two photographic albums showcasing two of Poland's most outstanding natural areas (the Biebrza Valley and the Knyszyn Forest), and a Polish translation of Jared M. Diamond's Pulitzer Prize winning book Guns, Germs, and Steel.

== Awards ==
Konarzewski has won the following awards:

- the Polish Prime Minister's Award for his DSc thesis (1997),
- the silver Cross of Merit (2004),
- an honorary doctorate from the Poznań University of Medical Sciences (2013),
- the Research Prize of Division II of the Polish Academy of Sciences (2014).
