= Polish Academy of Sciences =

National academy of sciences for Poland

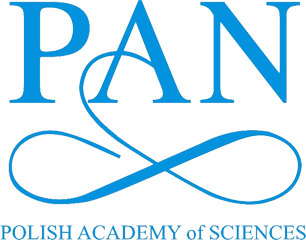

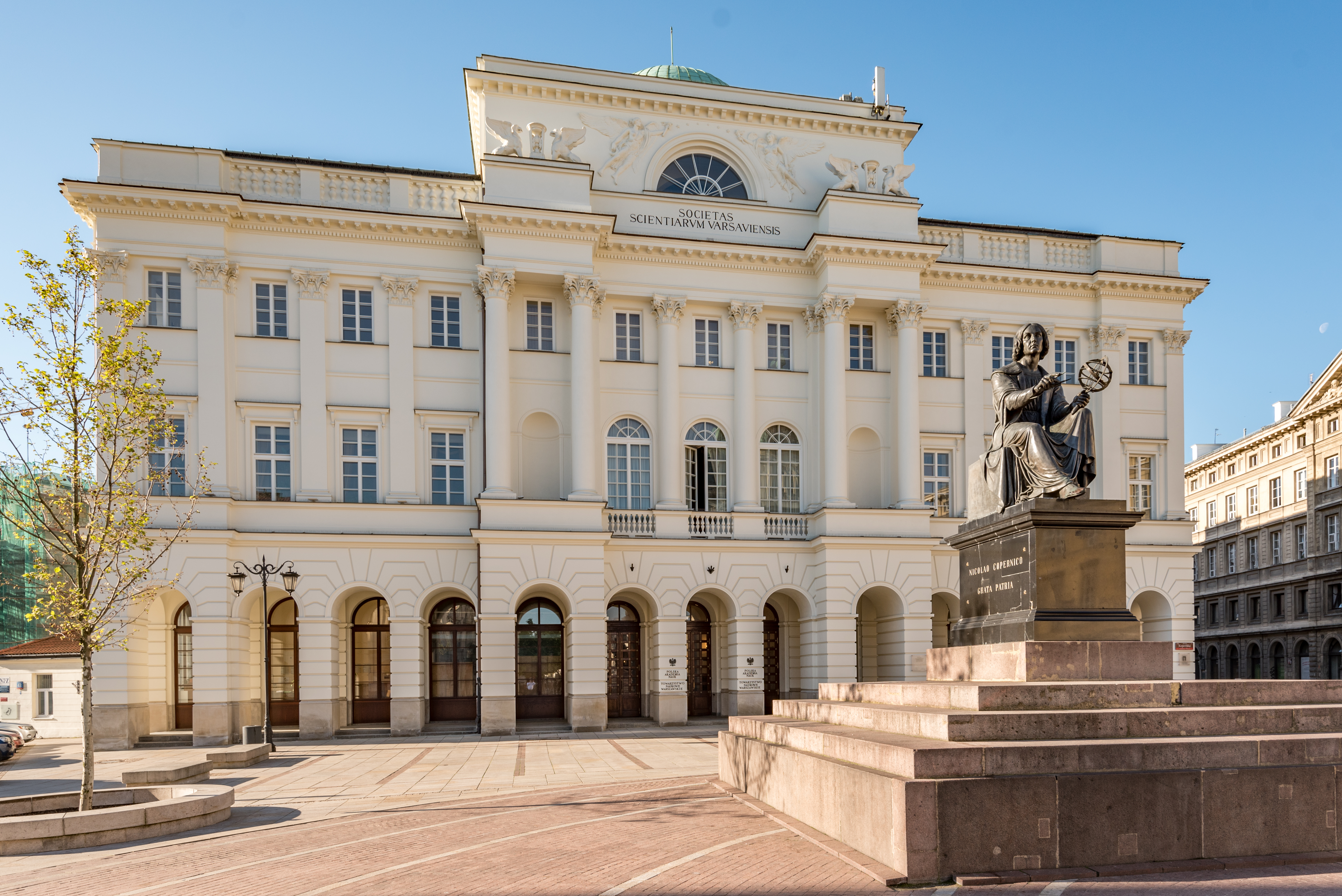
- The Staszic Palace (the seat of PAN), and Copernicus Monument
- Abbreviation: PAN
- Formation: 30 October 1951; 74 years ago
- Type: National academy; academy of sciences
- Headquarters: Warsaw
- Region served: Poland
- President: Marek Konarzewski
- Website: pan.pl
- Formerly called: Warsaw Scientific Society; Warsaw Society of Friends of Learning

The Polish Academy of Sciences (Polish: Polska Akademia Nauk, PAN) is a Polish state-sponsored national academy of sciences and institution of higher learning. Headquartered in Warsaw, it is responsible for spearheading the development of science across the country by a society of distinguished scholars and a network of research institutes.

It was established in 1951, during the early period of the Polish People's Republic following World War II.

== History ==
The Polish Academy of Sciences was established by the merger of earlier science societies, including the Polish Academy of Learning (Polska Akademia Umiejętności, abbreviated PAU), with its seat in Kraków, and the Warsaw Society of Friends of Learning (Science), which had been founded in the late 18th century.

The Polish Academy of Sciences functions as a learned society acting through an elected assembly of leading scholars and research institutions. The Academy has also, operating through its committees, become a major scientific advisory body.

Another aspect of the Academy is its coordination and overseeing of numerous (several dozen) research institutes. PAN institutes employ over 2,000 people and are funded by about a third of the Polish government's budget for science.

== Leadership ==
The Polish Academy of Sciences is led by a President, elected by the assembly of Academy members for a four-year term, together with a number of Vice Presidents.

The President for the 2019–2022 term was Jerzy Duszyński (his second term in the post), together with five Vice Presidents: Stanisław Czuczwar, Stanisław Filipowicz, Paweł Rowiński, Roman Słowiński, and Romuald Zabielski.

On 20 October 2022, General Assembly of the Polish Academy of Sciences elected Marek Konarzewski to become the new President of the Academy for the 2023–2026 term. On 8 December 2022, another session of General Assembly of the Academy elected four Vice Presidents at the recommendation of the President Elect; as such Mirosława Ostrowska, Natalia Sobczak, and Dariusz Jemielniak, and Aleksander Welfe were elected as Vice Presidents of the Academy for the 2023–2026 term.

All the Presidents of the Polish Academy of Sciences to date, by term, are as follows:

Presidents of the Polish Academy of Sciences
| Term | President |
|---|---|
| 1952–1956 | Jan Bohdan Dembowski |
| 1957–1962 | Tadeusz Kotarbiński |
| 1962–1971 | Janusz Groszkowski |
| 1971–1977 | Włodzimierz Trzebiatowski |
| 1977–1980 | Witold Nowacki |
| 1980–1983 | Aleksander Gieysztor |
| 1984–1990 | Jan Karol Kostrzewski |
| 1990–1992 | Aleksander Gieysztor |
| 1993–1998 | Leszek Kuźnicki |
| 1999–2001 | Mirosław Mossakowski |
| 2002–2003 | Jerzy Kołodziejczak |
| 2003–2006 | Andrzej Legocki |
| 2007–2014 | Michał Kleiber |
| 2015–2022 | Jerzy Duszyński |
| 2023–2026 | Marek Konarzewski |

== Institutes ==
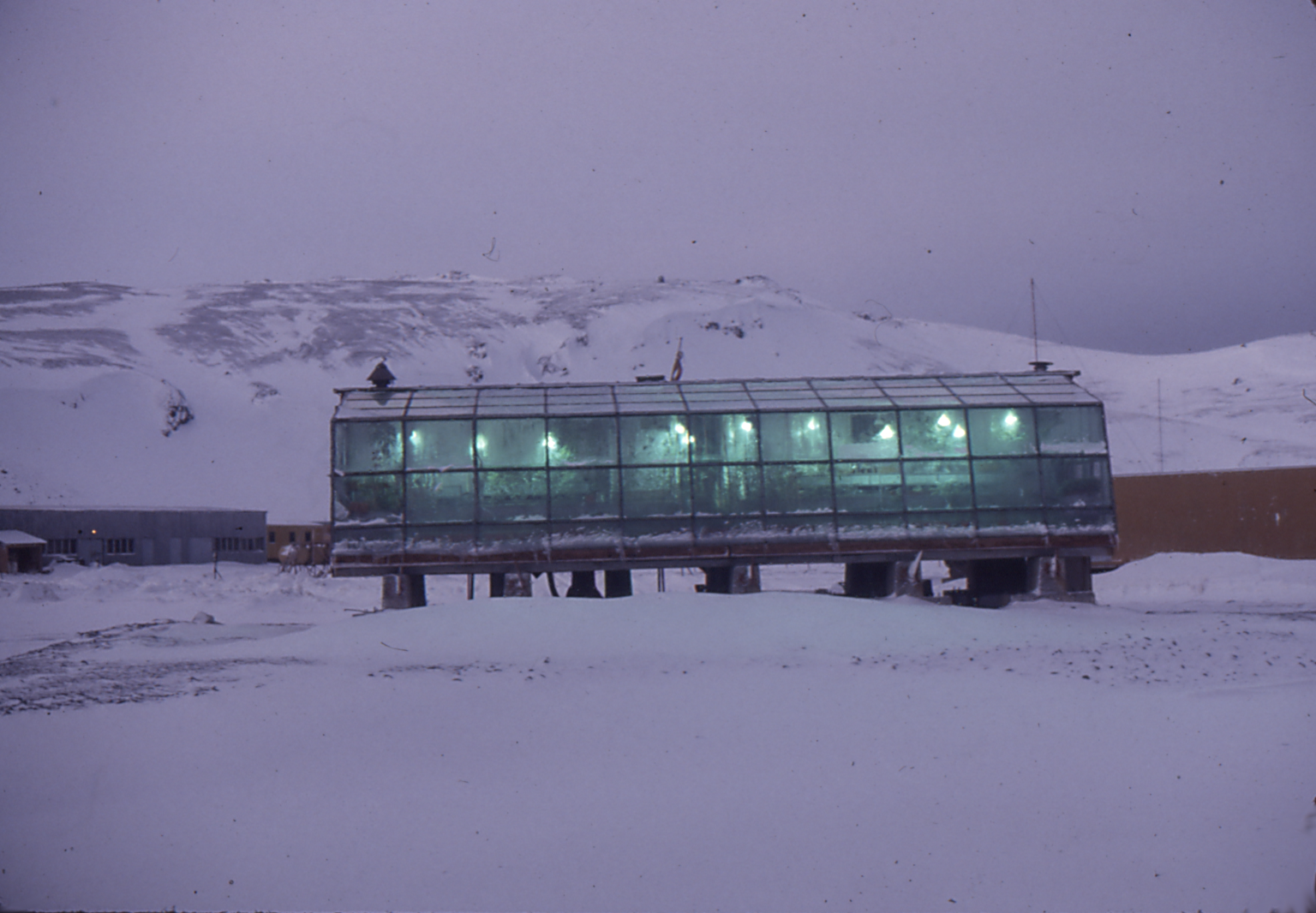
The PAN-managed Henryk Arctowski Polish Antarctic Station

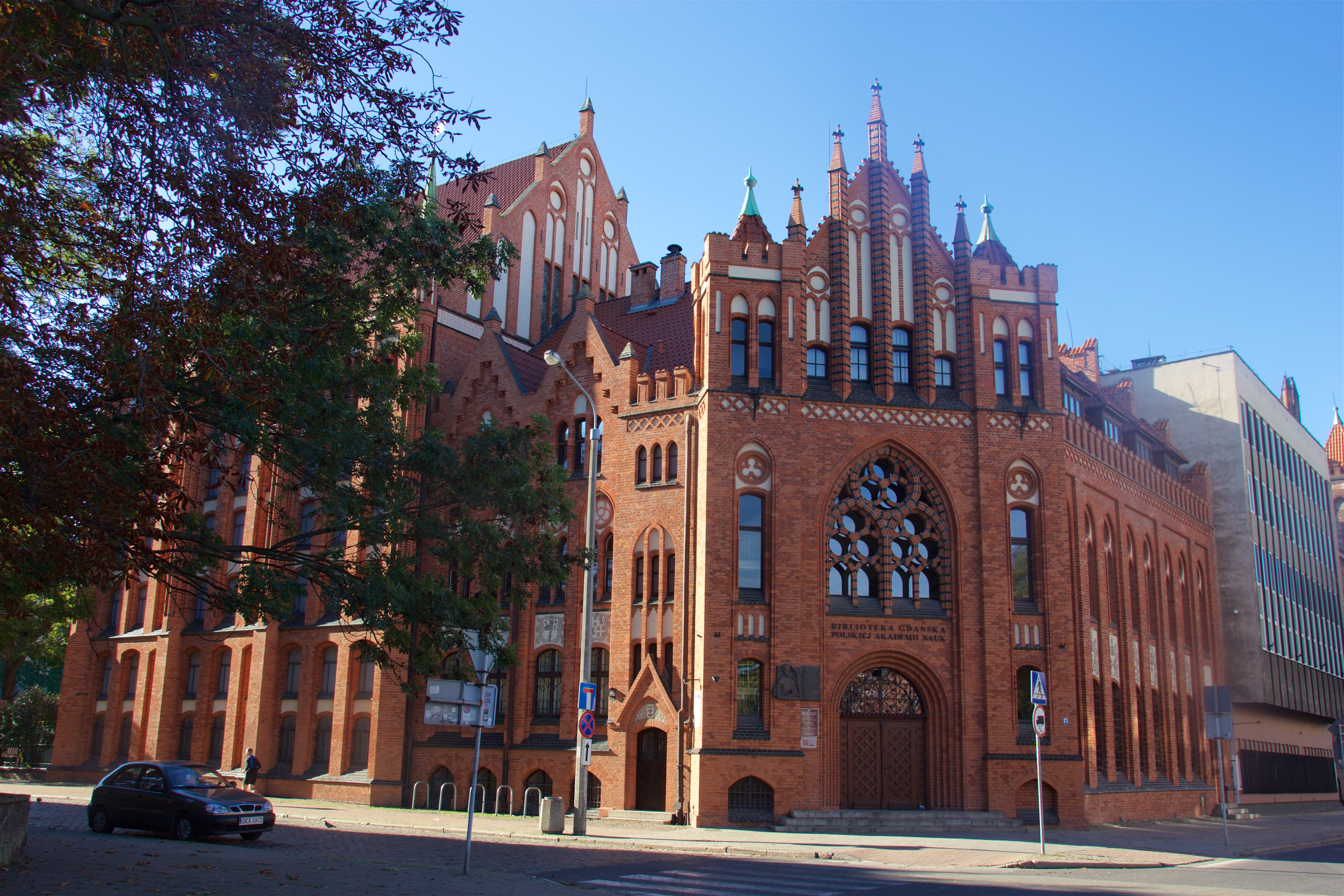
PAN's Gdańsk Library

The Polish Academy of Sciences has numerous institutes, including:

- Hirszfeld Institute of Immunology and Experimental Therapy
- Nencki Institute of Experimental Biology
- Centre of Molecular and Macromolecular Studies - established in 1972 in Łódź.
- Bohdan Dobrzański Institute of Agrophysics
- Museum and Institute of Zoology
- Kielanowski Institute of Animal Physiology and Nutrition
- Mammal Research Institute of the Polish Academy of Sciences
- Institute of Pharmacology of the Polish Academy of Sciences - established, 1954, became an independent institute in 1974; publishes the journal Pharmacological Reports.
- Institute of Psychology
- International Institute of Molecular Mechanisms and Machines, Polish Academy of Sciences
- Institute of Slavic Studies
- Institute of High Pressure Physics
- Institute of Hydro-Engineering
- Nicolaus Copernicus Astronomical Center
- Institute of Fundamental Technological Research
- Institute of Metallurgy and Materials Science
- Institute of Physical Chemistry
- Department of Turbine Dynamics and Diagnostics of the Institute of Fluid-flow Machinery of the Polish Academy of Sciences
- Institute of Nuclear Physics of the Polish Academy of Sciences
- Institute of Physics of the Polish Academy of Sciences
- Institute of Mathematics of the Polish Academy of Sciences
- Institute of Computer Science of the Polish Academy of Sciences
- Institute of Theoretical and Applied Informatics, Polish Academy of Sciences
- Institute for the History of Science, Polish Academy of Sciences
- Institute of Economics of the Polish Academy of Sciences
- Institute of Literary Research of the Polish Academy of Sciences
- Tadeusz Manteuffel Institute of History of the Polish Academy of Sciences

== Notable members ==
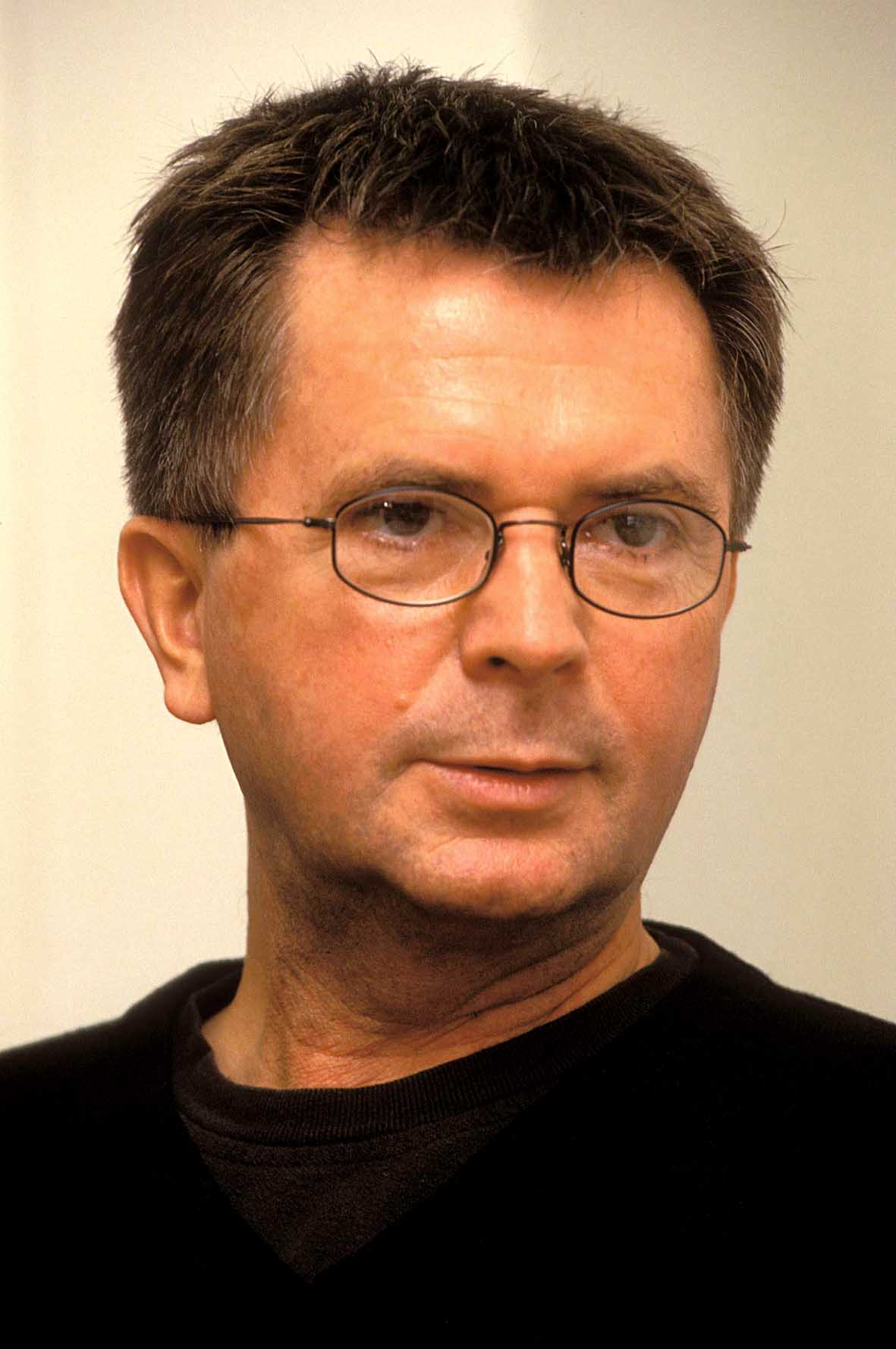
Aleksander Wolszczan

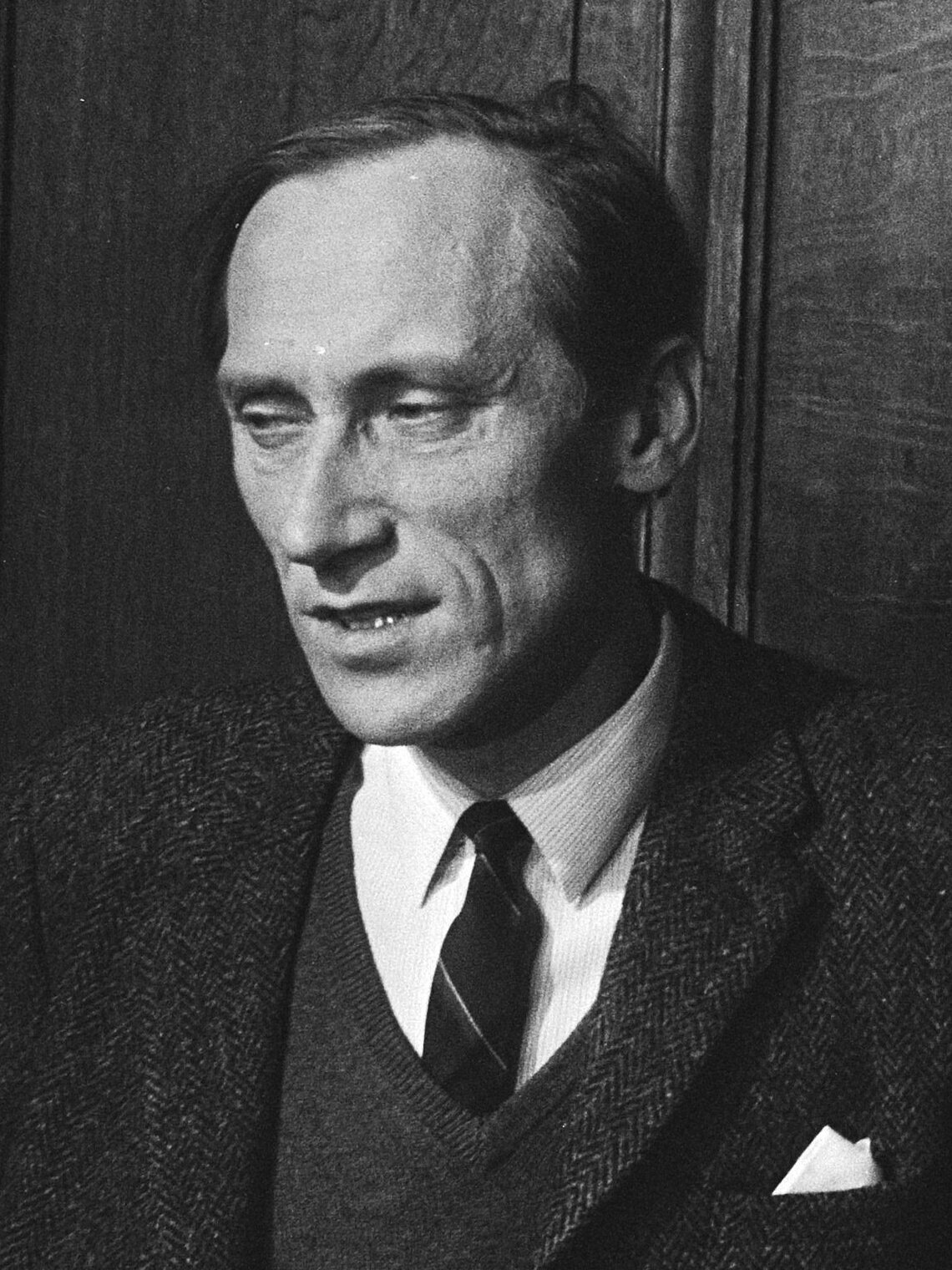
Leszek Kołakowski

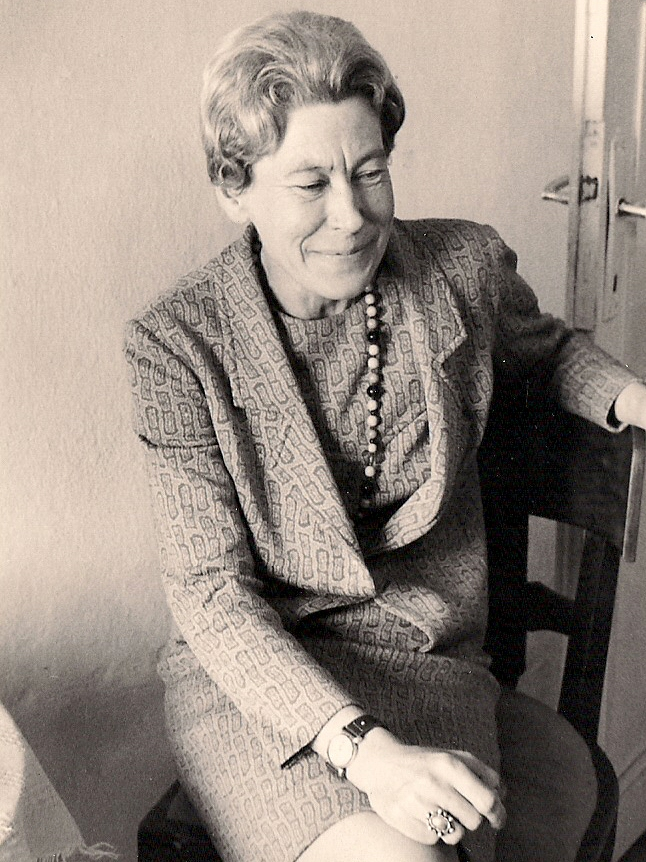
Wanda Leopold

Notable members of the Polish Academy of Sciences
| Name | Field |
|---|---|
| Bogdan Baranowski | Chemist |
| Franciszek Bujak | Historian |
| Carsten Carlberg | Biochemist |
| Tomasz Dietl | Physicist |
| Aleksandra Dunin-Wąsowicz | Archaeologist |
| Zofia Hilczer-Kurnatowska | Archaeologist |
| Maria Janion | Scholar, critic and theoretician of literature |
| Zofia Kielan-Jaworowska | Paleontologist |
| Franciszek Kokot | Nephrologist |
| Stanisław Konturek | Physician |
| Leszek Kołakowski | Philosopher |
| Bożena Kostek | Computer scientist and audio engineer |
| Roman Kozłowski | Paleontologist |
| Jacek Leociak | Literary scholar |
| Wanda Leopold | Author, translator and literary critic |
| Mieczysław Mąkosza | Chemist |
| Zenon Mariak | Neurosurgeon and professor |
| Zenon Mróz | Engineer |
| Karol Myśliwiec | Archaeologist |
| Witold Nowacki | Mathematician; president of the Academy (1977–1980) |
| Czesław Olech | Mathematician |
| Janina Oszast | Palaeobotanist |
| Bohdan Paczyński | Astrophysicist |
| Krystian Pilarczyk | Hydraulic engineer |
| Włodzimierz Ptak | Immunologist |
| Danuta Ptaszycka-Jackowska | Geographer and landscape architect |
| Andrzej Rottermund | Art historian and museologist; director of the Royal Castle in Warsaw (1991–2015) |
| Marianna Sankiewicz-Budzyńska | Electronics engineer and academic |
| Andrzej Schinzel | Mathematician |
| Jan Strelau | Psychologist |
| Zofia Sulgostowska | Archaeologist |
| Piotr Sztompka | Sociologist |
| Michał Strzelecki | Electrical Engineer |
| Joanna Tokarska-Bakir | Anthropologist and religious studies scholar |
| Andrzej Trautman | Physicist |
| Andrzej Udalski | Astrophysicist and astronomer |
| Jerzy Vetulani | Pharmacologist and neuroscientist |
| Jan Woleński | Philosopher |
| Aleksander Wolszczan | Astronomer |
| Bernard Zabłocki | Microbiologist and immunologist |
| Stanisław Zagaja | Pomologist, professor and director of the Research Institute of Pomology and Floriculture |

== Foreign members ==
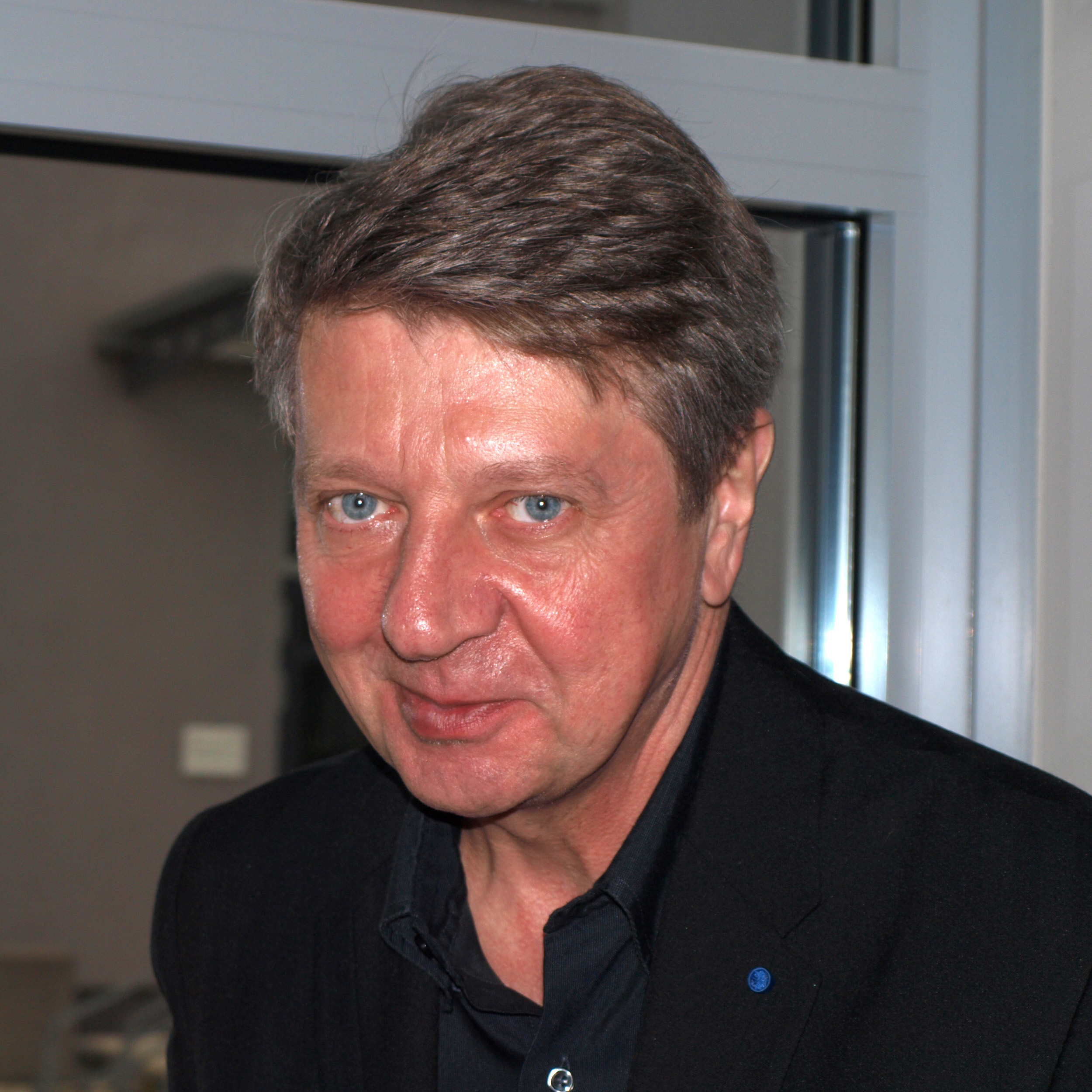
Krzysztof Matyjaszewski, Wolf Prize winner

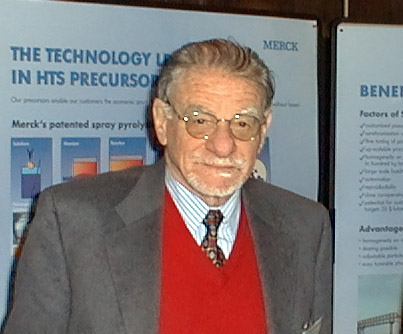
K. Alex Müller, Nobel Prize winner

- Victor Ambros, American-Polish developmental biologist
- Aage Bohr, physicist
- Aaron Ciechanover, biologist
- Zbigniew Darzynkiewicz, cell biologist
- Joseph H. Eberly, physicist
- Erol Gelenbe, computer scientist and engineer
- Martin Hairer, mathematician
- Jack K. Hale, mathematician
- Stephen T. Holgate, immunopharmacologist (2001)
- Ernst Håkon Jahr, linguist
- Marta Kwiatkowska, computer scientist
- Krzysztof Matyjaszewski, Polish chemist working at Carnegie Mellon University
- Robert K. Merton, sociologist
- Karl Alexander Müller, physicist
- Roger Penrose, mathematician
- Carlo Rubbia, physicist
- Peter M. Simons, philosopher
- Boleslaw Szymanski, computer scientist
- Chen Ning Yang, physicist
- George Zarnecki, art historian

== Periodicals ==
- Acta Arithmetica
- Acta Asiatica Varsoviensia
- Acta Ornithologica
- Acta Palaeontologica Polonica
- Acta Physica Polonica
- Annales Polonici Mathematici
- Annales Zoologici
- Archaeologia Polona
- Archives of Acoustics
- Fundamenta Mathematicae

== See also ==
- Academy of Sciences
- French Academy of Sciences
- Polish Academy of Learning (headquartered in Kraków)
- Poznań Society of Friends of Learning
- Royal Society
- Warsaw Society of Friends of Learning
