= Popple =

Popple may refer to:

== Places ==
=== South Africa ===
- Popple Peak, a mountain in the Drakensberg range

=== United States ===
- Popple, Michigan, a community in Colfax Township, Huron County, Michigan
- Popple Grove Township, Mahnomen County, Minnesota
- Popple River (Minnesota)
- Popple River, Wisconsin, a town in Forest County, Wisconsin
- Popple River (Pine River), a tributary of the Pine River, Wisconsin
- Popple Township, Clearwater County, Minnesota

== People ==
- Popple (surname)

== Other uses ==
- Popple, a character from Mario & Luigi: Superstar Saga
- Poplar, woody plants of the genus Populus; sometimes referred to as "Popples"
- Popple, northern English regional name for the corncockle or for various other cornfield weeds, like the corn poppy or the charlock
- Popples, a 1980s toy line and cartoon show

== See also ==
- Poppler (disambiguation)
- Poppleton (disambiguation)
- Poppel (disambiguation)
