= Popiel (surname) =

Popiel is the surname of the following people:

- Andrzej Popiel (1936–2020), Polish stage actor
- Antoni Popiel (1865–1910), Polish sculptor
- Ignatz von Popiel, a.k.a. Ignacy Popiel (1863–1941), Polish (Galician) chess master
- Irena Popiel (1925–2010), Polish nun
- Jan Popiel (born 1947), Danish-Canadian ice hockey player, brother of Poul
- Karol Popiel (1887–1977), Polish politician
- Kazimierz Popiel (1894–1957), Polish mining engineer
- Maurycy Popiel (born 1990), Polish actor
- Poul Popiel (born 1943), Canadian-Danish former ice hockey player, brother of Jan
- Stefan Popiel (1896–1927), Polish footballer
- Stepan Popel, a.k.a. Stefan Popiel (1909–1987), Ukrainian-Polish (Galician) chess champion
- Tadeusz Popiel (1863–1913), Polish painter
- Wincenty Teofil Popiel (1825–1912), Polish Roman Catholic priest

== Fictional characters ==
- Bronio von Popiel in operetta Polenblut and its adaptations
