= Balladyna =

Balladyna may refer to:

- Balladyna (drama), an 1834 tragedy by Juliusz Słowacki
- Balladyna (album), a 1975 album by Tomasz Stańko
- Balladyna (film), a 2009 thriller starring Faye Dunaway
