= Popiel (disambiguation) =

Popiel II was a legendary 9th century ruler of the West Slavic tribe of Goplans.

Popiel may also refer to:

- Popiel I, legendary ruler of Poland, father of Popiel II
- Popiel (surname)
- Popiel, Lublin Voivodeship, village in Poland
- Papilys, town in Lithuania known as Popiel in Polish
- King Popiel, character in Balladyna (film)

== See also ==
- Popeil
