= Van Popta =

Van Popta is a Dutch surname. Notable people with the surname include:

- Misty Van Popta (fl. 2011), Canadian politician
- Tako van Popta (born 1953), Canadian politician

== See also ==
- Van Poppel
