= Popple (surname) =

Popple is a surname, and may refer to:

- Alured Popple (1699–1744), British colonial administrator
- Catherine Popple, English international lawn bowler
- James Popple (born 1964), Australian CEO, lawyer, computer scientist, public servant and academic
- William Popple (1638–1708), English Unitarian merchant and translator
- William Popple (colonial administrator) (1701–1764), English official, dramatist and Governor of Bermuda, son of the previous

== See also ==
- Van Poppel, surname
- Poeppel, surname
- Doris Swords Poppler (1924–2004), American attorney
