= Popeil =

Popeil is a surname. Notable people with the surname include:

- Lisa Popeil (born 1956), American voice coach, singer, and musician
- Ron Popeil (1935–2021), American inventor and marketer

== See also ==
- Popel
- Popiel (disambiguation)
