= Popel =

Popel is a surname with multiple origins. Notable people with the surname include:

- Aleh Popel (born 1983), Belarusian footballer
- Esther Popel (1896–1958), African-American poet, activist, and educator
- Heike Popel (born 1961), East German luger
- Nikolai Popel (1901–1980), Soviet lieutenant-general
- Stepan Popel (1909–1987), Ukrainian-American chess champion

== See also ==
- Popiel (disambiguation), Polish surname
- Poepel
- Pöppel, German surname
