= Irena Popiel =

Polish nun (1925–2010)

Mother Elżbieta OSBap
- Born: Irena Maria Popiel; June 22, 1925; Kraków
- Died: October 15, 2010 (aged 85); Warsaw
- Parent(s): Kazimierz Popiel, Anna née Latinik

Ecclesiastical career
- Religion: Christianity
- Church: Catholic Church
- Ordained: 1952
- Congregations: Benedictine Nuns of Perpetual Adoration of the Blessed Sacrament
- Offices held: prioress

Irena Maria "Ika" Popiel (22 June 1925 – 15 October 2010) was a Polish nun who served at the order of the Benedictine Nuns of Perpetual Adoration of the Blessed Sacrament, and was a prioress of the order's convent in Warsaw, as well as the initiator and co-founder of the Conference of Superiors of Female Confraternity Monasteries in Poland.

== Biography ==
She was born in Kraków in 1925 as the first child of Kazimierz Popiel (1898–1957) – a mining engineer; and Anna née Latinik (1902–1969) – the daughter of Franciszek Latinik and Helena née Stiasny-Strzelbicka, later a clerk at the Metropolitan Court in Kraków, who was awarded with the cross Pro Ecclesia et Pontifice. In 1936, Irena's younger brother Andrzej was born.

In the 1930s, Kazimierz and Anna Popiel lived first in Boryslav and then in Lviv, where Irena Popiel graduated from the elementary school and two classes of the Ursuline gymnasium.

In the face of the German army invasion of Poland, Kazimierz Popiel took part in the 1939 defensive war, and was captured and imprisoned as a war prisoner. In order to avoid deportation to the Soviet Union, Anna Popiel moved in 1940 with her children to her parents' house in Kraków. There, Irena Popiel attended the underground education with a natural profile, organized by the Adam Mickiewicz High School. She passed her high school diploma in July 1944. In the years 1942–1945, she also worked as an accountant in the J. Grosse S.A. Company. At that time, she completed a nursing training and acted as a nurse in the Home Army. From 1943, she participated in a secret pastoral priesthood run by the Dominican Order in Kraków, and attended lectures in theology. In 1944, in conspiracy, she began studies at the Faculty of Medicine of the Jagiellonian University.

After the end of World War II, she joined the order of the Benedictine Nuns of Perpetual Adoration of the Blessed Sacrament. In 1945, she was accepted into the Benedictine Abbey in Tyniec. In 1947, she entered the convent of the Benedictine Sisters of the Holy Sacrament in Warsaw. She joined the monastery in November 1947. Her superiors decided that she shall stop her studies. She made her temporary profession on June 22, 1949, and the solemn profession in 1952. In the same year, she received the Consecration of Virgins from the Primate of Poland Stefan Wyszyński. She took the name Elżbieta.

In the years 1962–1967 she was a prioress of the Silesian Benedictine monastery of the Blessed Sacrament, formerly located in Lviv. Afterwards, in the years 1967–1971 and 1977–1989, she was a prioress of the Benedictine monastery in Warsaw. She was the President of the Polish Federation of Benedictine Monasteries of the Perpetual Adoration of the Blessed Sacrament in 1980–1992, at that time taking part in four international Meetings of the Federation.

In the years 1984–1989 she was a member of the Commission of the Nuns by the Abbot Primate of the Benedictine Confederation and was a representative of Polish Benedictine nuns at the International Symposium of the Benedictine nuns and two congresses of the Benedictine Abbots in Rome.

In the years 1968–1971 and 1981–1992 she was a member of the Section, and later of the Commission of the Cloister Orders at the Consulate of the Major Superiors of Religious Orders in Poland. As the initiator and co-founder, she participated in the work on the creation of the Conference of Superiors of Female Confraternity Monasteries in Poland (Konferencja Przełożonych Żeńskich Klasztorów Kontemplacyjnych w Polsce). In the opinion of her companion sisters, she "played a significant role in the preparation of the Statute of the Conference and in the work aimed at its official erection".

In the years 1974–1994 she ran the Secretariat of the Subcommittee on Assistance to Cloistered Monasteries of the Episcopal Commission for Convents, under the direction of Father Michał Mroczkowski, then provincial superior of the Dominican Order.

In 1997 she was awarded the "Ecclesiae populoque servitium praestanti" Medal by the Primate of Poland Józef Glemp.

In the opinion of her companion nuns, "although she was the granddaughter of the famous general Franciszek Ksawery Latinik, and inherited from him energetic disposition and clarity of mind – she was characterized by great simplicity, directness, honesty and humility".

She died after a short illness on the night of 15 October 2010, in the convent of the Sisters of the Holy Sacrament in Warsaw. Funeral ceremonies took place on October 18, 2010, at the St. Kazimierz Church in Warsaw. The funeral Mass was headed by Father Gabriel Bartoszewski.
