= Poppler =

Poppler may refer to:

- "Popplers", a fictional food in "The Problem with Popplers", an episode of the television series Futurama
- Poppler (software), PDF rendering library

== See also ==
- Populus (disambiguation)
- Popple (disambiguation)
- Popples, a series of fantasy characters created by Those Characters From Cleveland (TCFC), a subsidiary company of American Greetings
