= Adam Hanuszkiewicz =

Polish actor (1924–2011)

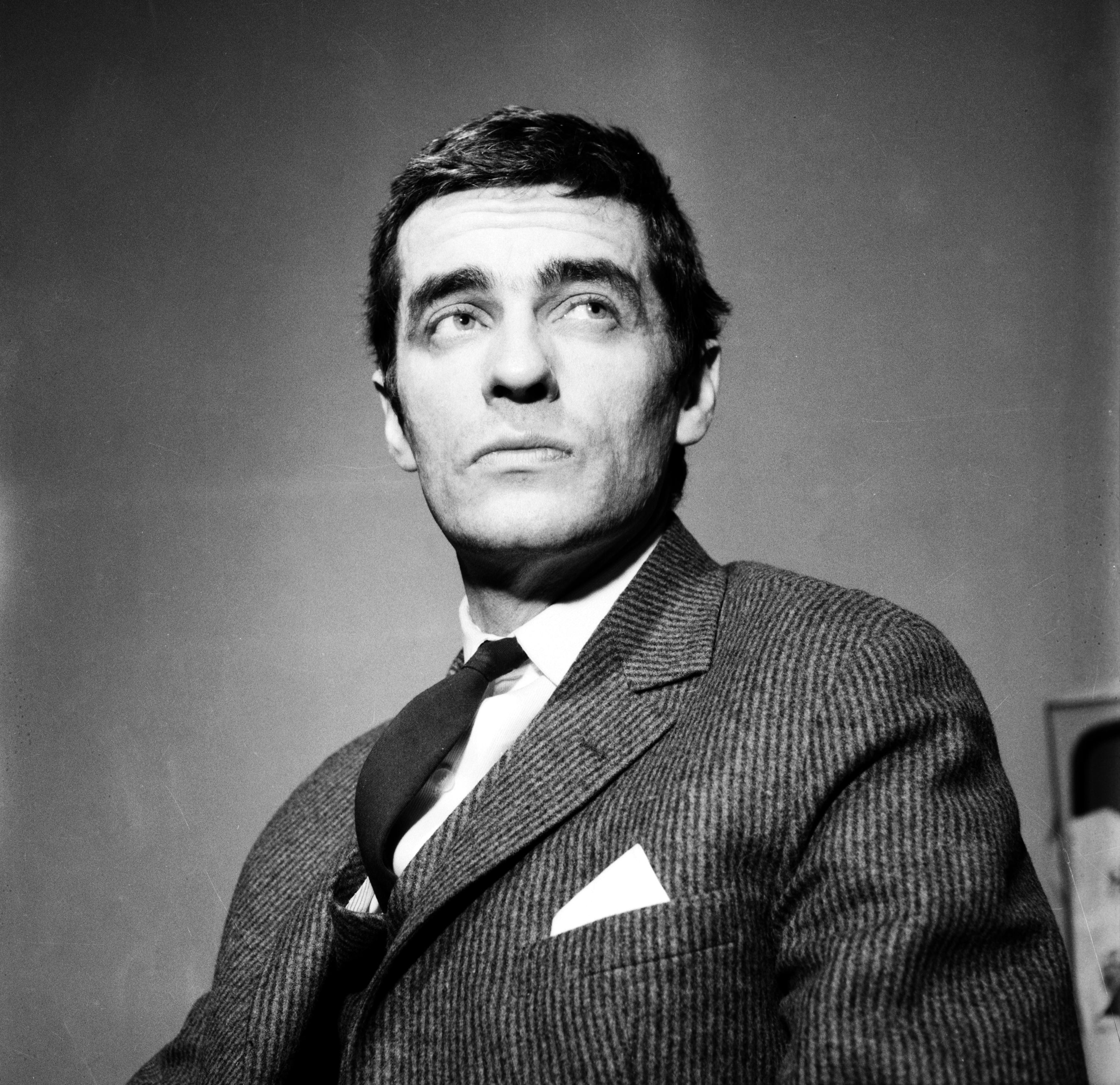
- Born: 16 June 1924; Lwów, Poland
- Died: 4 December 2011 (aged 87); Warsaw, Poland
- Occupations: Actor, Director
- Years active: 1945–2005
- Spouses: Marta Stachiewiczówna (m. ?; div. ?); Zofia Rysiówna (m. 1948; div. ?); Zofia Kucówna (m. 1976; div. 1989); Magdalena Cwenówna (m. 1990)
- Children: 3

Adam Hanuszkiewicz (16 June 1924 – 4 December 2011) was a Polish actor and theater director. He was known for his involvement in Television Theater, as well as for his invaluable stage and film works.

== Life and career ==
Hanuszkiewicz was born in Lwów, Poland in 1924. He began his acting career at the Wanda Siemaszkowa Theatre in Rzeszów, where he made his debut in Aleksander Fredro's The Revenge (Zemsta) directed by Stefania Domańska (1945). Between 1946 and 1955, Hanuszkiewicz acted in Polish theaters in Kraków, Warsaw, and Poznań.

Hanuszkiewicz's directing career developed simultaneously in television and theater. He made his debut as a theater director in 1951, and then he became involved in the formation of the Television Theater as co-founder in the early 1950s. In 1955 he directed his first television play, Jerzy Andrzejewski's The Golden Fox. Hanuszkiewicz was the chief director of Television Theater from 1957 until 1963. In 1959, he also staged Adam Mickiewicz's The Forefathers (Dziady) whose poetics referred to the Warsaw Uprising.

Hanuszkiewicz became artistic director of several theaters in Warsaw: the Powszechny Theater, the National Theater, and the New Theater. His controversial theater works from the 1950s through 1970s were often meant to appeal to mass audiences, by creating a popular theater rooted in his previous television experiences. He incorporated mass cultural expressions, such as cabaret, cartoons and pop music.

Hanuszkiewicz was the film director for Spóznieni przechodnie (1962). In 1967, he acted in the film Hands Up! directed by Jerzy Skolimowski.

In 1974, Hanuszkiewicz directed one of the most notorious stagings of Balladyna at the Grand Theatre in Warsaw. The story was set as the opera Goplana in 1897, with Goplana riding a Honda motorcycle on stage and wearing a costume stylized to resemble Jane Fonda from Barbarella. A record number 336,911 spectators watched the Grand Theatre production.

During the 1970s, Hanuszkiewicz also began collaborating with theaters in Finland.

From 1989 to 2007 Hanuszkiewicz was the general director of Nowy Theatre in Warsaw. His last work for stage was an adapted play that premiered in 2005 of a novel written by Mark Haddon. In 2006 Hanuszkiewicz received the Commander's Cross of the Order of Merit to Lithuania.

Hanuszkiewicz died in Warsaw in 2011, aged 87.
