= Janusz Rieger =

Polish linguist (born 1934)

Janusz Andrzej Rieger
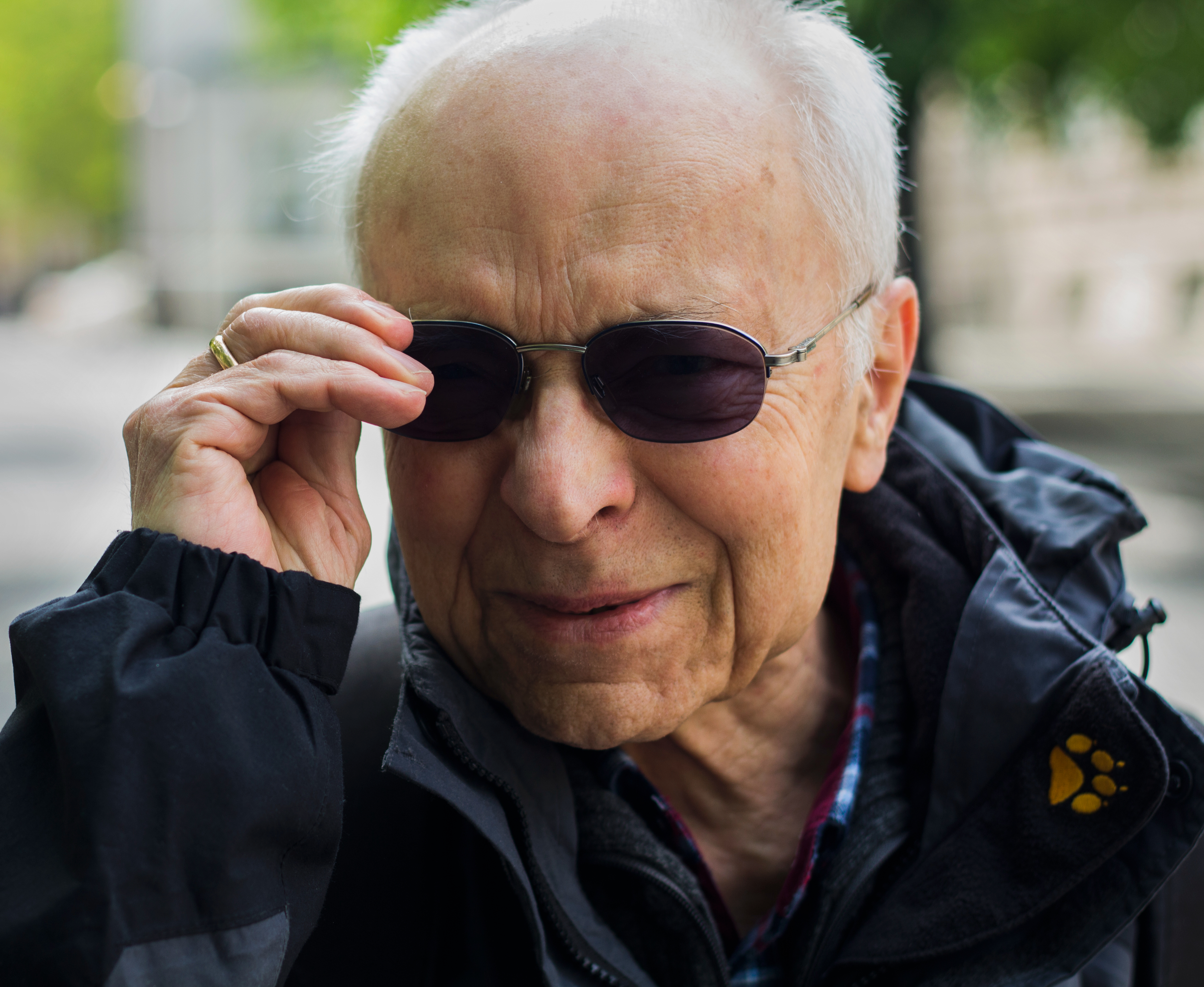
- Janusz Rieger (2019)
- Born: 20 September 1934 (age 92); Kraków
- Citizenship: Polish
- Occupations: linguist slavist

Janusz Andrzej Rieger (born 20 September 1934) is a Polish linguist and slavist, specializing in the history of the Polish language in Kresy, a professor of the humanities and a member of the Warsaw Scientific Society. He worked at the Institute of Slavic Studies and the Institute of Polish Language of the Polish Academy of Sciences and lectured at the University of Warsaw.

== Biography ==
He was born in 1934 in Kraków as the son of Andrzej Rieger, a prosecutor and lieutenant of the Polish Army military reserve force, and Antonina Latinik, the first champion of Poland in woman's foil; a grandson of Roman Rieger, mining engineer, lecturer and inventor, and Franciszek Latinik, general of the Polish Army. His father Andrzej Rieger was murdered in the Katyn massacre in 1940.

In his youth, between the 1940s and 1950s, Janusz Rieger was a scout and served as an altar boy at St. Florian's Church in Kraków, where Karol Wojtyła was a vicar. Rieger was a member of the Catholic student group that rejected Marxist ideology and was the narrow circle of Wojtyła's pupils, the so-called Environment. As a member of that group, Rieger regularly took part in seminars and walking tours guided by Wojtyła. He remained in close touch with the future pope, also in his mature life. Priest Wojtyła blessed Rieger's marriage, baptised his children and was also Rieger's confessor. After Wojtyła was elected as Pope, Rieger visited him in Rome and Castel Gandolfo, and he took part in the celebrations related to the Pope's pilgrimages to Poland. They kept correspondence.

In 1955, he graduated in Russian studies from the Jagiellonian University, where among his professors was Zdzisław Stieber. In 1956, he started working as a PhD student at the University of Warsaw, where he received PhD in 1967. In 1960, he started work at the Department of Slavic Studies, later converted into the Institute of Slavic Studies of the Polish Academy of Sciences, where he was employed until 1997 and was a chairman of the Institute Scientific Council (1990–1998). He was designated a professor of the humanities in 1989. From 1997 until 2004, he was a professor at the Institute of the Polish Language of the Polish Academy of Sciences. He lectured at the University of Warsaw, among others, at its College Artes Liberales; at the University of Łódź (1980–1982) and the John Paul II Catholic University of Lublin (1988–1990). He was a promoter in eighteen doctoral dissertations.

He was the organizer of the Polish Studies College for young scientists from the East at the Institute of Slavic Studies of the Polish Academy of Sciences (1993–1996, Stefan Batory Foundation grant) and the initiator of the International School of Humanities at the Center for Research on Ancient Tradition in Poland and Central and Eastern Europe of the University of Warsaw. He was also one of the founders of the Slavic Foundation established in 1992, an institution supporting research and dissemination of knowledge about the languages and cultures of Slavic countries. From 1989 until 1997, he was a vice chairman of the Commission for the Determination of Place Names.

Since 1983, he has been a member of the Warsaw Scientific Society. He was a member of the Committee of Linguistics of the Polish Academy of Sciences (since 1974, vice-chairman 1990–2003, an honorary member since 2005) and the Committee of Slavic Studies of the Polish Academy of Sciences (1991–2011). Since 1999, he has been an honorary member of the Kharkiv Scientific Society. From 1980 until 1981, he was a vice-chairman of Solidarity structures in the Polish Academy of Sciences.

His interests include the Polish language in Kresy, Ukrainian dialectology, history of the Ukrainian and Russian language and lexicography. He researched, among others, Polish dialects in Ukraine and the Lemko language and culture through gathering oral testimonies. Together with Vyacheslav Verenitsch, he was the initiator and co-editor of the series of the Linguistics Committee of the Polish Academy of Sciences Studia nad polszczyzną kresową (Studies on the Polish language in Kresy) and Język polski dawnych Kresów Wschodnich (The Polish language of the former Kresy). From 1988, he cooperated in publishing the Carpathian Dialectological Atlas as the chairman of the Polish team and co-editor of all volumes He was also a member of its editorial board (1997–1998). Since 1991, he has been a member of the editorial board of the journal Slavia Orientalis. In 1992, along with the team that was under his supervision, he received the Kazimierz Nitsch Award for Atlas gwar bojkowskich (The Atlas of Boykos Dialects).

He edited and annotated his father's diary, which begins with enlistment in September 1939 and runs through Soviet captivity until his death in April 1940. The diary, titled Zapiski z Kozielska (Notes from Kozielsk), was published in 2015.

He is married to Ewa (born 1936), an electronics engineer.

By the decision of the President of Poland on 22 November 2017 "for outstanding contribution to the development of Polish Slavic studies, for achievements in scientific and didactic work and for popularizing the history and culture of Kresy", he was awarded the Knight's Cross of the Order of Polonia Restituta.

== Works (selection) ==
- Nazwy wodne dorzecza Sanu. Zakład Narodowy im. Ossolińskich. 1969.
- Nazwy rzeczne w dorzeczu Warty. Zakład Narodowy im. Ossolińskich. 1975. With Ewa Wolnicz-Pawłowska.
- Imiennictwo ludności wiejskiej w ziemi sanockiej i przemyskiej w XV w. Zakład Narodowy im. Ossolińskich. 1977.
- Słownik tematyczny rosyjsko-polski. Wiedza Powszechna. 1979. With Ewa Rieger. Second extended edition 2003.
- Atlas gwar bojkowskich. Tomy I–VII. Zakład Narodowy im. Ossolińskich. 1980–1991. Developed by the team managed by Janusz Rieger, mainly based on field records of Stefan Hrabiec.
- Gewässernamen im Flußgebiet des Wisłok. Stuttgart: Franz Steiner Verlag Wiesbaden. 1988.
- Z dziejów języka rosyjskiego. Wydawnictwa Szkolne i Pedagogiczne. 1989. Second extended edition 1998.
- Słownictwo i nazewnictwo łemkowskie. Wydawnictwo Naukowe Semper. 1995.
- A Lexical Atlas of the Hutsul Dialects of the Ukrainian Language. Harvard University Press; Semper. 1997. Edited on the basis of notes of Jan Janów and his disciples.
- Język mniejszości w otoczeniu obcym. Wydawnictwo Naukowe Semper. 2002. Edited by Janusz Rieger.
- Gewässernamen im Flußgebiet des San. Stuttgart: Franz Steiner Verlag. 2003.
- Dawna i współczesna polszczyzna na Kresach. Wydawnictwo Naukowe Semper. 2004. Edited by Janusz Rieger.
- Słownictwo polszczyzny gwarowej na Litwie. Wydawnictwo DiG. 2006. With Irena Masojć and Krystyna Rutkowska.
- Українсько–польський тематичний словник (Ukraïns'ko-pol's'kij tematičnij slovnik). Vidavnictvo Ukraïns'kogo katolic'kogo unìversitetu. 2007. With Orisâ Dems'ka-Kul'čic'ka.
- Słownictwo gwarowe przesiedleńców z Ukrainy: słownik porównawczy kilku wsi w Tarnopolskiem. Wydawnictwo Lexis. 2007. Edited by Janusz Rieger.
- Słownictwo kresowe: studia i materiały. Wydawnictwo DiG. 2008. Edited by Janusz Rieger.
- Общекарпатский диалектологический атлас. Указатели (Obŝekarpatskij dialektologičeskij atlas). Instytut Języka Polskiego PAN. 2012.
- Słownictwo polszczyzny gwarowej na Brasławszczyźnie. Wydawnictwo Naukowe Sub Lupa. 2014.
- Zapiski z Kozielska. Narodowe Centrum Kultury. 2015. A diary of Andrzej Rieger edited by Janusz Rieger.
- Mały słownik łemkowskiej wsi Bartne. Wydawnictwa Uniwersytetu Warszawskiego. 2016.
- Atlas ukraińskich gwar nadsańskich opracowany na podstawie zapisów terenowych Stefana Hrabca. Tom 1. Wydział „Artes Liberales” Uniwersytetu Warszawskiego. 2017.
- Leksyka prawnicza w polskich zapiskach sądowych z Ukrainy (XVI i XVII wiek). Wydawnictwo DiG. 2017. Edited by Janusz Rieger.
- Słownik gwary łemkowskiej wsi Wysowa. Wydawnictwa Uniwersytetu Warszawskiego. 2018. A dictionary by Oleksandr Hoisak, edited by Janusz Rieger and Madina Alekseyeva.

Based on the source material
