= Poppel =

Poppel may refer to:

- Poppel (pig), French name of the Belgian Landrace
- Poppel, a village in the Belgian municipality of Ravels
- Poppel, a village in Sachsen-Anhalt, Germany
- Ernst Pöppel, German psychologist and neuroscientist

== See also ==
- Van Poppel
- Popple (disambiguation)
