= Antonina Latinik-Rieger =

Polish fencer (1906–1989)

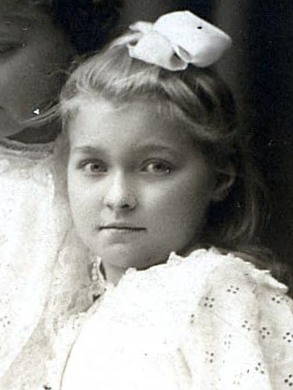
- Antonina Latinik-Rieger (1906–1989)
- Born: 17 October 1906; Kraków
- Died: 18 October 1989 (aged 83); Kraków
- Citizenship: Polish
- Occupations: fencer teacher office worker
- Children: Janusz; Jerzy
- Parent(s): Franciszek Latinik; Helena Stiasny-Strzelbicka

Antonina Latinik-Rieger (17 October 1906 – 18 October 1989) was a Polish fencer, first champion of Poland in woman's foil fencing, teacher, and an official of the Kraków Curia.

== Biography ==
She was born in 1906 as a third daughter of captain Franciszek Latinik and Helena Stiasny-Strzelbicka, younger sister of Anna (1902–1969) and Irena (1904–1975).

She graduated in physical education and geography from Jagiellonian University.

In years 1927–1928 Antonina was a fencer of AZS Kraków. In 1928 she won the first Polish championship in woman's foil fencing, outrunning Maria Wanda Dubieńska and Jadwiga Rieger.

Latinik worked as a school teacher, she taught physical education and geography; for many years she worked as an official of Kraków Curia. She was awarded with a Vatican distinction Pro Ecclesia et Pontifice.

Her husband, Andrzej Rieger (1906–1940), prosecutor and second lieutenant of Polish Army reserve, was killed in Katyn massacre. Antonina and Andrzej had two sons: Janusz (born 1934) and Jerzy.

She died in 1989 and was buried in the family tomb at the Rakowicki Cemetery in Kraków.
