= Polish–Czechoslovak War =

Part of the Polish Czech wars

- Part of the Polish–Czechoslovak border conflicts
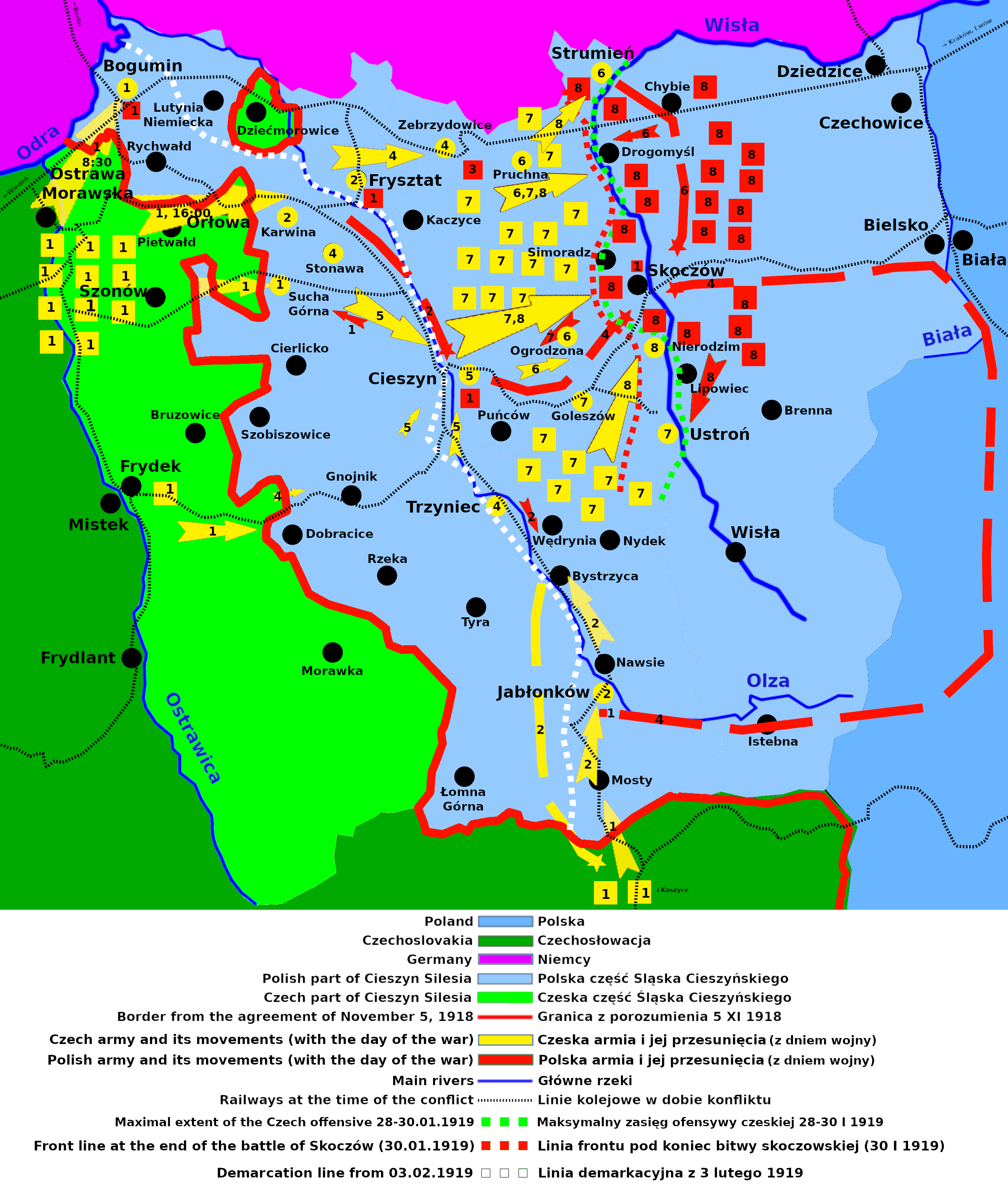
- Map of the war
Date	23–30 January 1919
Location	Cieszyn Silesia
Result	Czechoslovak victory
Territorial changes	Extension of Czechoslovak control over Teschen Silesia

Belligerents
First Czechoslovak Republic	Second Polish Republic

Commanders and leaders
Josef Šnejdárek	Franciszek Latinik

Strength
15,000	3,000–4,000 regular soldiers, including: 6 Infantry battalions; 2 Cavalry squadrons; 1 Artillery battery; 1 Armoured train; 4,000–6,500 volunteers, mostly local miners and students; Local gendarmerie

Casualties and losses
Total: 175–184 44–53 killed 124 injured 7 missing	Total: 2,336 92 killed 855 injured 576 POWs; 813 missing

The Czechoslovak-Polish War, widely known in Czech sources as the Seven-Day War (Czech: Sedmidenní válka) was a military confrontation between Czechoslovakia and Poland over the territory of Cieszyn Silesia in early 1919.

Czechoslovak forces invaded the Polish part (with an interim local civilian government, and with a strong majority support for allegiance to Poland, in reflection of earlier views, with the exception of the Frýdek, which had a Czech majority since 19th century settlement, and which had not at the time been claimed or controlled by the locals or the Polish side or a Polish political movement) of Cieszyn Silesia to prevent elections to the Polish Legislative Sejm in the disputed territory and to prevent the local population's contributions to the Polish army. The Czechoslovak army made rapid advancements, capturing most of Cieszyn Silesia by the end of January. The bulk of the Polish army was engaged in the Polish–Ukrainian War at the time, and the Polish forces faced a numerically superior and better equipped Czech Army in Cieszyn Silesia. The Entente had pushed for an armistice. The result of the war was the new demarcation line, which expanded the territory controlled by Czechoslovakia. It led to a new division of the region of Cieszyn Silesia in July 1920, and left a substantial Polish minority in Czechoslovakia in the region later called Trans-Olza because the demarcation line ran through the Olza river. The events, including later Czechoslovak policies in the territory led to further disputes and tensions, leading to the Polish annexation of Trans-Olza in 1938 during the dismemberment of Czechoslovakia.

== Background ==
During the final months of World War I, Polish and Czechoslovak diplomats met to discuss the common border between the two new countries. By the time the armistice was declared, most of the border was worked out except for three small politically sensitive areas in Upper Silesia and Upper Hungary, which were claimed by both countries.

Cieszyn Silesia or the Duchy of Teschen (Polish: Cieszyn and Czech: Těšín) was a small area in south-eastern Silesia, one of the Duchies of Silesia after the feudal fragmentation of the earlier Duchy of Silesia. The Duchy had been suzerain to the Kingdom of Bohemia, part of the Lands of the Bohemian Crown beginning in 1335. Latin, German, Czech, Moravian and finally Polish served as an official language of the region, however throughout the ages many historical sources indicate the local population remained mostly or overwhelmingly Polish-speaking, with everyday speech being Cieszyn Silesian dialect, regardless of the official language governing, even after the settlement of Czechs, in large part professionals, white-collars workers during the 19th century industrialization of the region. The region had hosted no local Czech independence organizations, but had been the site of a Polish association since the early 19th century, and had been the site of a branch of the Polish Social Democratic Party of Galicia and Cieszyn Silesia, mentioned in its full name, which had been the most popular party in the region. The region's many coal mines were operated by mostly Polish-identified and Polish-speaking workers, who expected the areas, with the exception of the Frýdek region, to be part of an independent Polish state in the future.

The last Austrian census of 1910 (determining nationality according to the main communication language (German: Umgangssprache) of the respondents), showed that it was predominantly Polish-speaking in three districts (Cieszyn (Teschen), Bielsko (Bielitz), and Fryštát (Freistadt)) and mainly Czech-speaking in the fourth district of Frýdek (Friedek). Part of the Lechitic-speaking population (the Ślązakowcy – named after the newspaper Ślązak, Schlonsaken) claimed a distinct, Silesian identity, however never fully denying the old Polish roots of the local population or the status the local dialect as a dialect of the Polish language (which they used in their newspapers), but rather gradually becoming superior to the Polish culture in the Kingdom of Poland, thanks to becoming part of the German cultural sphere.

The chief importance of Cieszyn Silesia was the rich coal basin around Karviná and the valuable Košice-Bohumín Railway line which linked the Czech lands with Slovakia. Furthermore, in the north-western part of Cieszyn Silesia, the railroad junction of Bohumín served as a crossroad for international transport and communications. The leaders of Czechoslovakia had insisted forcibly on the indivisibility of the former Austrian Crownlands of Bohemia, Moravia and Silesia and their unwillingness to compromise on Cieszyn Silesia has been suggested by Mary Heimann to have been due to their desire to keep the Sudetenland region in Czechoslovakia. To allow Cieszyn Silesia to join Poland because it had a Polish majority would create a precedent for the German-speaking Sudetenland to join Germany, and it was largely for this reason the Czechoslovak government insisted that all of the former Duchy of Teschen was part of Czechoslovakia. The Czech argument was that the Poles were "not local" but an "incoming" population, and that the indigenous or 'autochthonous' population had been Czech, claiming local Poles were merely immigrants attracted to employment in coal mines throughout the 18th century. Those claims were not corroborated by Austrian population censuses throughout the 19th century. The influx of Poles from Galicia was directed mainly to Ostrava and surroundings, which lie outside of Cieszyn Silesia. Moreover, the Polish national movement in the region was active since the Spring of Nations in 1848, whereas the influx of Galician Poles began in 1870s.

On 5 November 1918, the Polish National Council and the Czechoslovak Committee concluded an agreement on the demarcation line for administrative and military purposes, and divided their respective spheres of influences at the municipal level, roughly along the ethnolinguistic identification lines. The Frýdek district and a small part of the Fryštát district was left on the Czech side, the remainder was accorded to the Poles.

== Forces ==
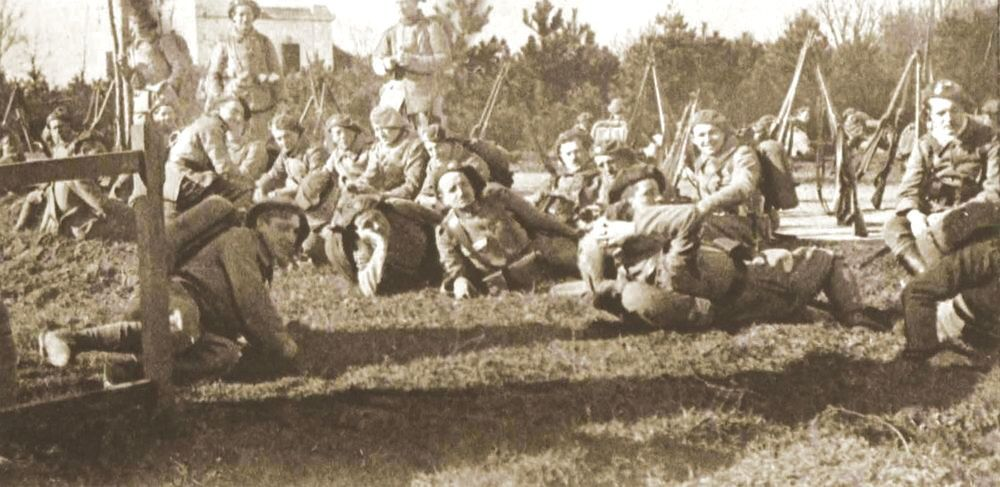
Czechoslovak legionaries from France in Cieszyn Silesia

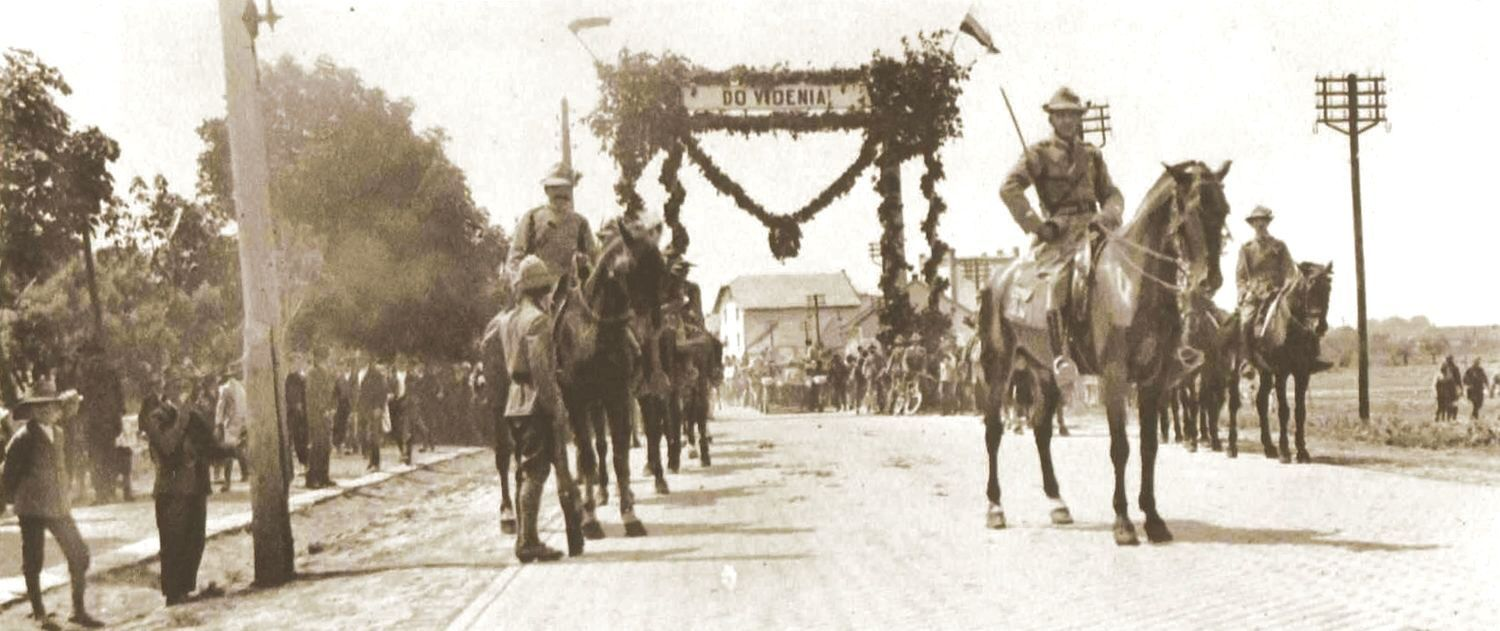
Czechoslovak legionaries from Italy in northwest Slovakia leaving for Cieszyn Silesia

The Czechoslovak side was led by Josef Šnejdárek. Czechoslovak military forces had been formed from the three legionnaire battalions of the 21st Rifle Regiment from France, the 54th Infantry Battalion of Olomouc, the 93rd Infantry Battalion of Fryštát, a volunteer battalion from Bohumín and a volunteer battalion from Orlová. The operations of the Czechoslovak forces were joined by other local volunteers, formed in the National Guard approximately 5,000 men strong. From the north-west of Slovakia came the main force that was sent to support the 35th Regiment from Italy, led by the Italian Colonel Graselli and later reinforced with the Rifle Regiment from Italy. During the war the Czechoslovak army was reinforced by the newly formed 2nd Brigade with a strength of six battalions, with the support of two artillery batteries, and one cavalry squadron.

The Czechoslovak army was further strengthened by the 28th Infantry Regiment's 1st Battalion, the 3rd Infantry Regiment's 1st Battalion, the 93rd Infantry Regiment's 2nd Battalion and 5 volunteer battalions.

Polish forces under the command of Franciszek Latinik were weaker than the Czechoslovak forces. At the end of World War I, Poland was fighting in border disputes with all its neighbors, and during the war with Czechoslovakia the main force was committed to the fighting the Polish–Ukrainian War in Eastern Galicia. The Polish forces were composed of six infantry battalions, two cavalry squadrons and an artillery battery. Other forces included approximately 550 members of the gendarmerie and around 4,000 (Polish claim) to 6,500 (Czech claim) local Polish volunteers. Polish forces were reinforced during the war.

== Battle ==
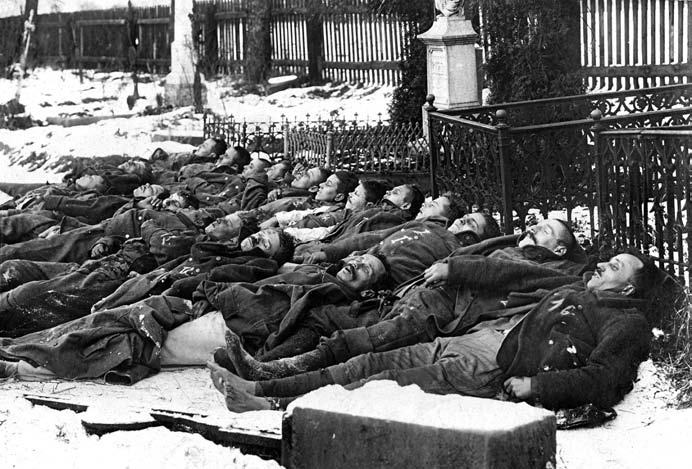
Corpses of Polish soldiers murdered by Czech legionnaires in Stonava on 26 January 1919

On 23 January 1919 at 11:00 in Cieszyn Silesia Polish commander Franciszek Latinik and Czechoslovak officer Josef Šnejdárek met with a group of officers, consisting of British, French, Italian and U.S. representatives (at the request of the Czechoslovak party). The Polish side was given an ultimatum, that they evacuate the area to the Biała River in less than two hours. After the expiry of this period, the Czechoslovak army started its operations at 13:00 following its operational guidelines to seize Bohumín/Bogumin and Karviná/Karwina. From the east, at the same time, an attack was launched by the Italian legionnaire unit. The Czechoslovak army moved forward, and took Bohumín (at 16:00), Orlová/Orłowa and Karviná/Karwina. Cieszyn Silesia was taken over by Czechoslovak forces on 27 January 1919. Polish troops retreated to the Vistula river.

On 30 January 1919 Josef Šnejdárek received the order to cross the Vistula and secure the railway line between Bohumín and Jablunkov/Jabłonków. They crossed the river and the Polish troops retreated to Skoczów, where the front line was stalled. Further Czechoslovak reinforcements arrived, which gave Šnejdárek an advantage over the Polish units. The Czechoslovak army prepared for an attack on Skoczów assuming that it would lead to the collapse of the Polish defenses.

On 31 January 1919, because of the pressure from the Triple Entente representatives, the attack on Skoczów was cancelled, and the Czechoslovak army ceased fighting. The Czechoslovak army withdrew to the new Green Line, established by the International Commission Agreement on the basis of the Czechoslovak–Polish Treaty, concluded on 3 February 1919 in Paris.

== Conclusion ==
The disputed territory was placed under international control. The final division of Cieszyn Silesia came in July 1920 as a result of the Spa Conference. In conclusion, the railway line connecting the Czech lands with Slovakia and the territory to the south of it were assigned to Czechoslovakia, while the territory north of the railway line was assigned to Poland. Vast majority of the coal mines, as well as Třinec Iron and Steel Works were on the territory assigned to Czechoslovakia.

In precise terms, Poland was given one-third of the population (142,000 out of 435,000), less than half of the territory (1002 km^{2} out of 2222), and the town of Cieszyn. Czechoslovakia received the districts of Fryštát and Frýdek, most of the area of the district of Cieszyn, the railway station of Cieszyn, Karviná and coal mines, Třinec with ironworks, and the entire Bohumín-Jablunkov railway line. Some 140,000 Poles were left on the Czech side.

== War crimes ==
On 26 January, Czechoslovak forces killed 20 Polish POWs in the village Stonava, which has been documented in photos. According to some sources, they were bayonetted to death. A monument has been erected in their memory in Stonava.

According to Polish claims an unspecified number of Polish POWs were also killed in the village of Bystřice and a number of civilians killed in Karviná. Several thousand people were forced to flee to Poland, who returned in 1938 with the Polish annexation of Trans-Olza and in turn started taking revenge on the local Czech populace. There is a monument in Orlová, commemorating the Czech victims of the war.

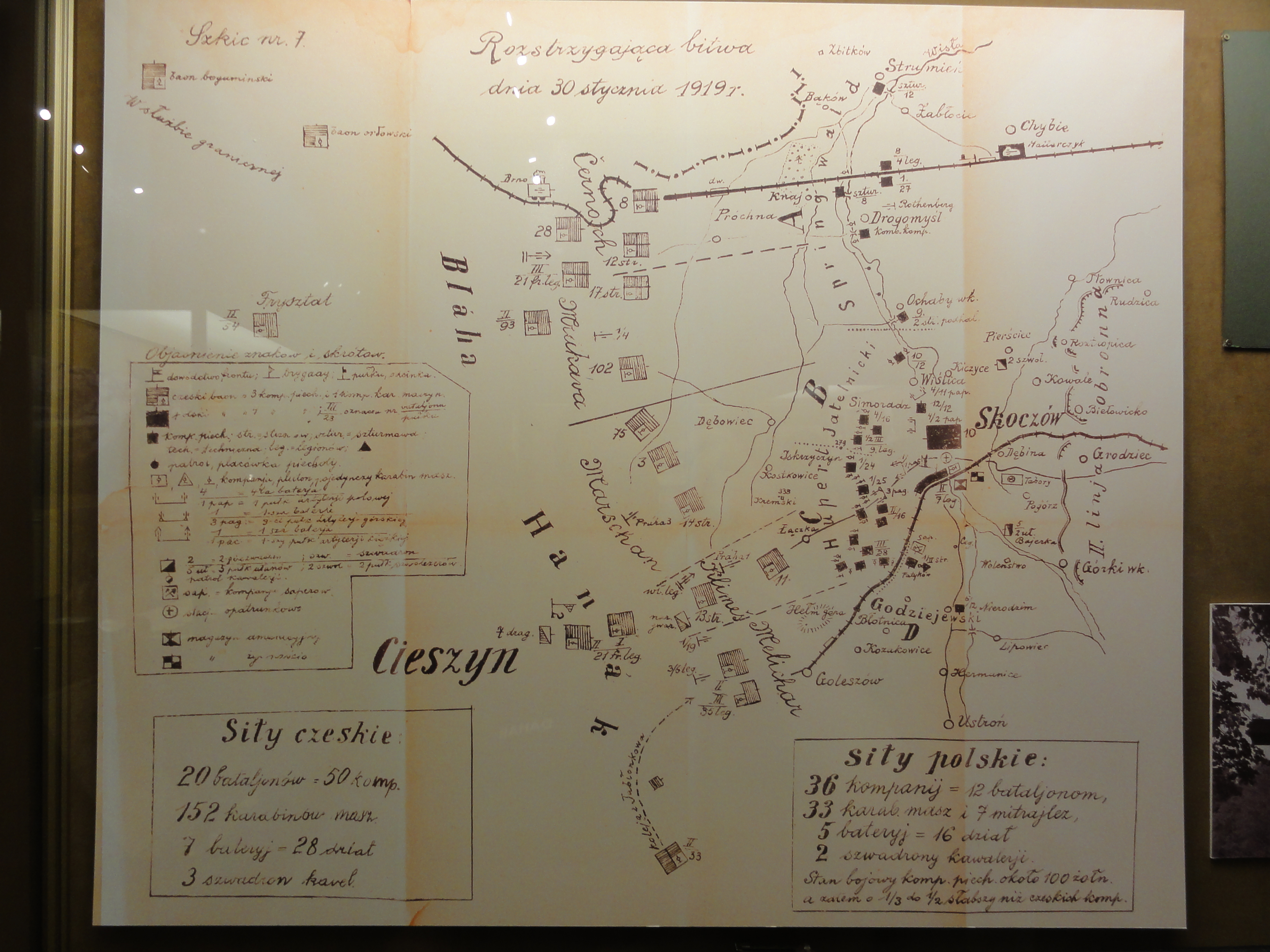
Skoczów battle

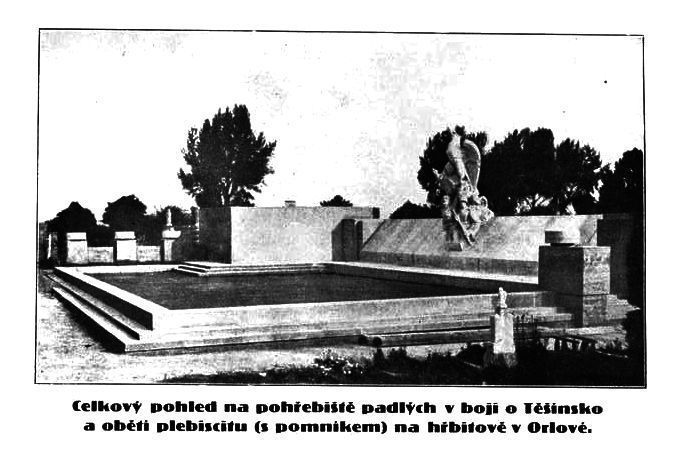
The original form of the monument in Orlová, commemorating the Czechoslovak victims

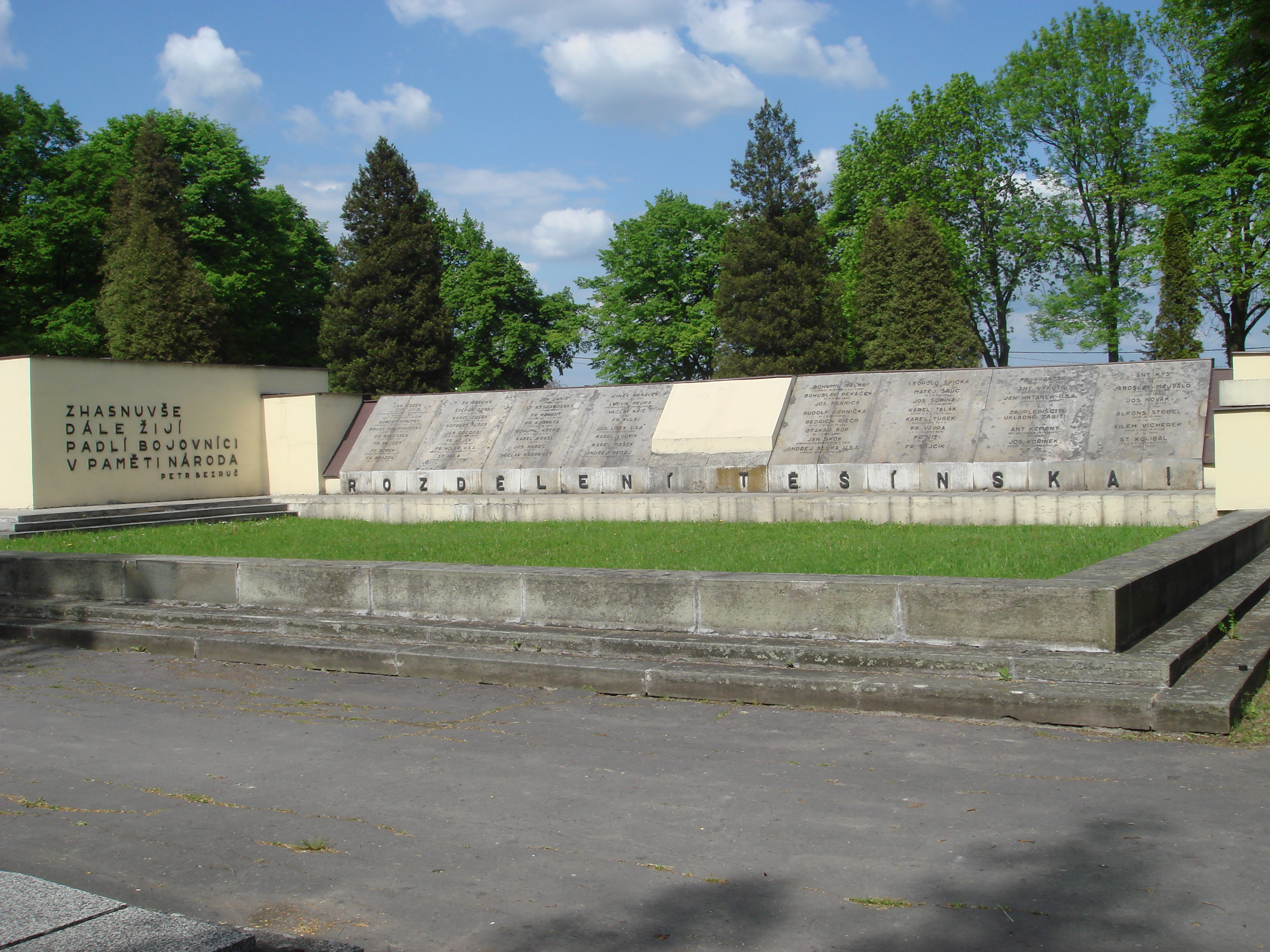
The current form of the monument in Orlová, commemorating the Czechoslovak victims

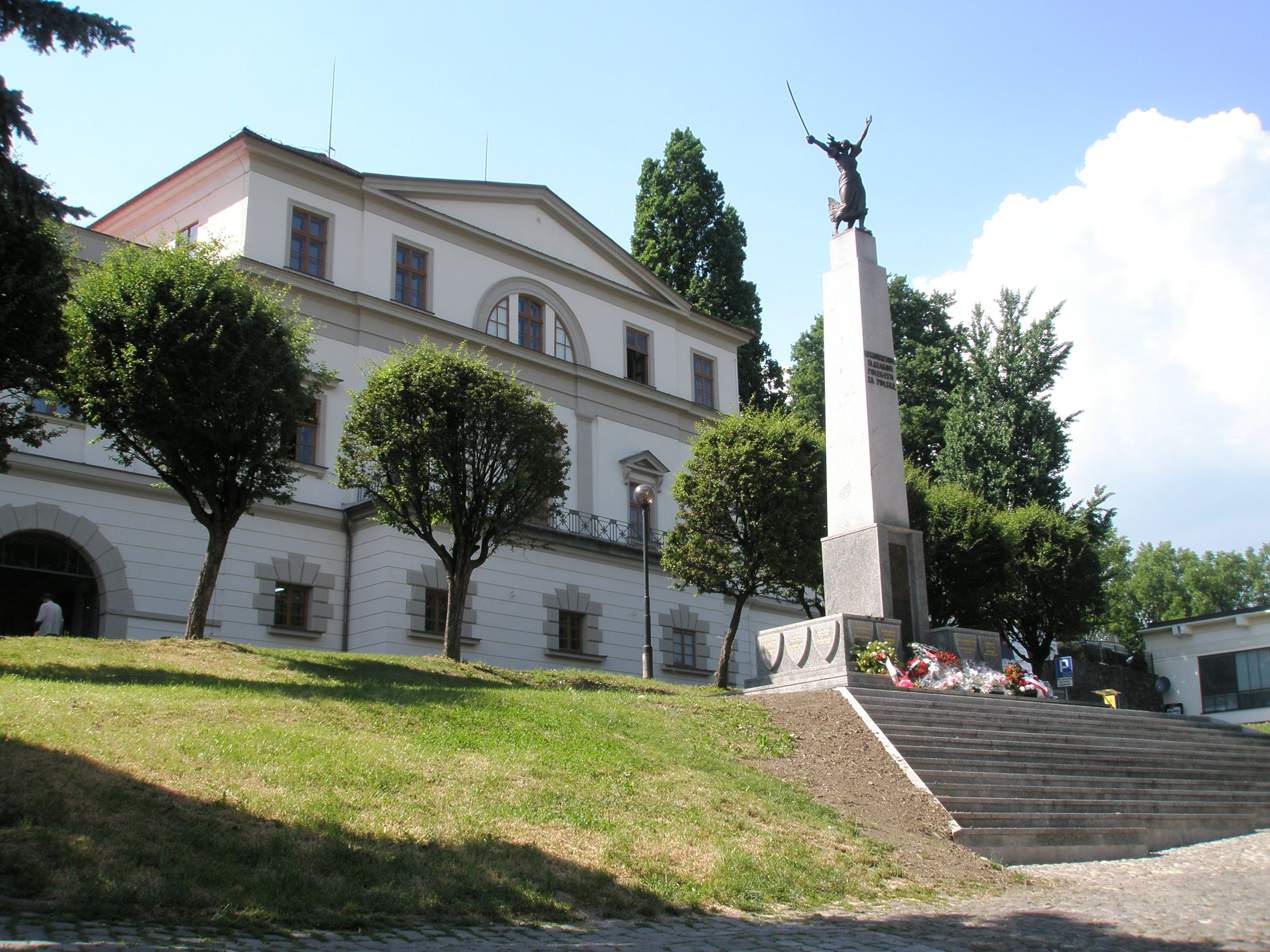
Memorial to Polish Silesian legionnaires in Cieszyn

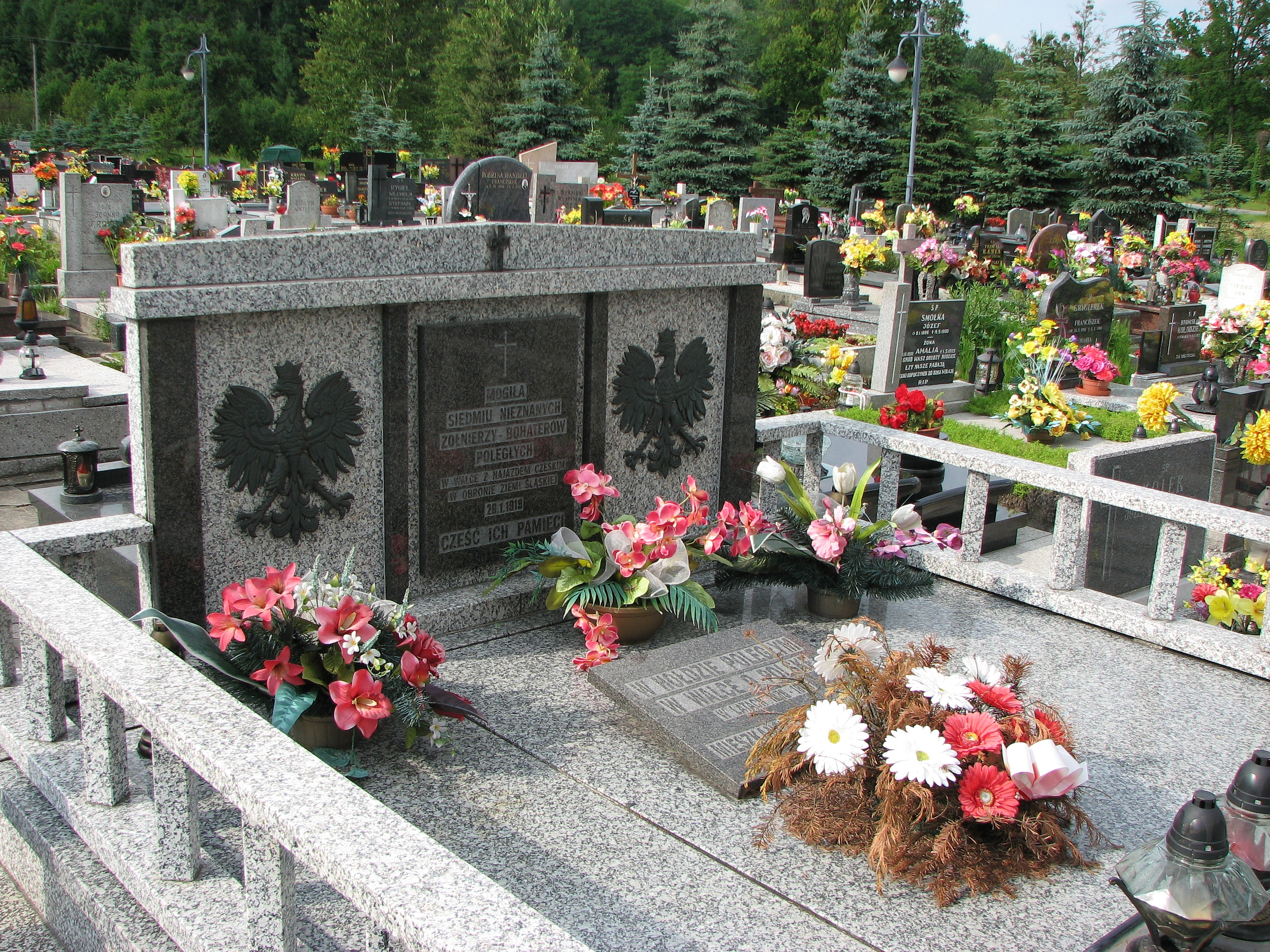
Monument to the Polish victims in Zebrzydowice

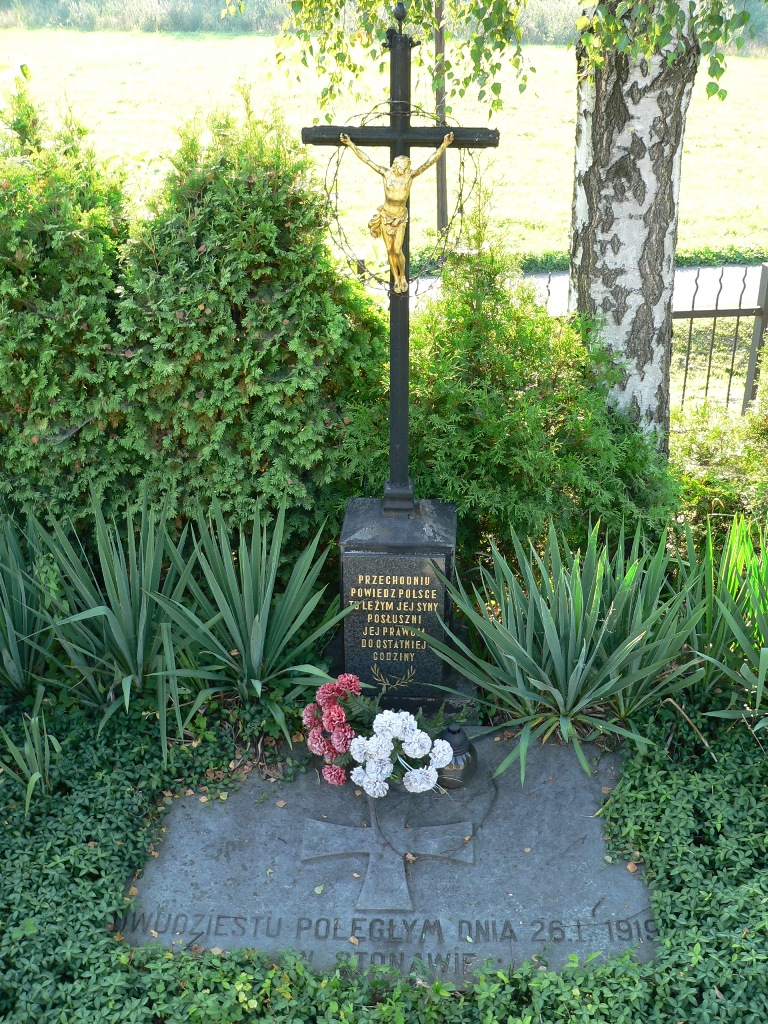
Grave of 20 Polish soldiers killed by Czech legionists on 26 January 1919 in Stonava
