= Kazimierz Popiel =

Polish mining engineer (1894–1957)

- Born: 24 December 1894
- Died: 8 January 1957 (aged 62)
- Citizenship: Polish

Kazimierz Popiel (24 December 1894 – 8 January 1957) was a Polish mining engineer and drillman operating in the oil industry, captain of the military reserve force of the Polish Army, participant of the World War I and the 1939 defensive war, prisoner of the Nazi camps.

== Biography ==
He was the son of Ferdynand Popiel and Wiktoria née Popiel.

He took part in World War I as a soldier in the ranks of Austro-Hungarian Army. In the battle of Piave he commanded an assault company. After Poland regained independence in the fall of 1918, he joined the Polish Army. In the first half of the 1920s, he was stationed in Przemyśl, where he was an adjutant of general Franciszek Latinik, commander of the District No. X Corps. Later, he was promoted to a captain of the military reserve force of the Polish Army.

He was a mining engineer and drillman active in the oil industry.

He married Anna née Latinik (1902–1969), the daughter of general Franciszek Latinik. Their children Irena and Andrzej were born in 1925 and 1936 respectively.

In the 1930s, Kazimierz and Anna Popiel lived first in Boryslav and then in Lviv.

In the face of the German army invasion of Poland, Kazimierz Popiel took part in the 1939 defensive war, and was captured and imprisoned as a war prisoner. He was in an oflag in Hungary, from where he was taken to Dachau concentration camp. His wife moved in 1940 with children to her parents' house in Kraków to avoid deportation to the Soviet Union.

In 1947, Kazimierz Popiel arrived in Kraków, passing through Szczecin, and he met with his family. In the following years, he was the chief mechanic of the Warsaw Geological Coal Mining Enterprise (Warszawskie Przedsiębiorstwo Geologiczne Górnictwa Węglowego).

He died on January 8, 1957, and was buried on January 11 the same year at the Bródno Cemetery in Warsaw.

== Decorations ==
- Cross of Valour
- Medal of the 10th Anniversary of People's Poland

Source.
