= Monument to the fallen for Těšín Silesia =

Commemorative monument in Orlová, Czech Republic

Coordinates: 49°50′26″N 18°25′29″E

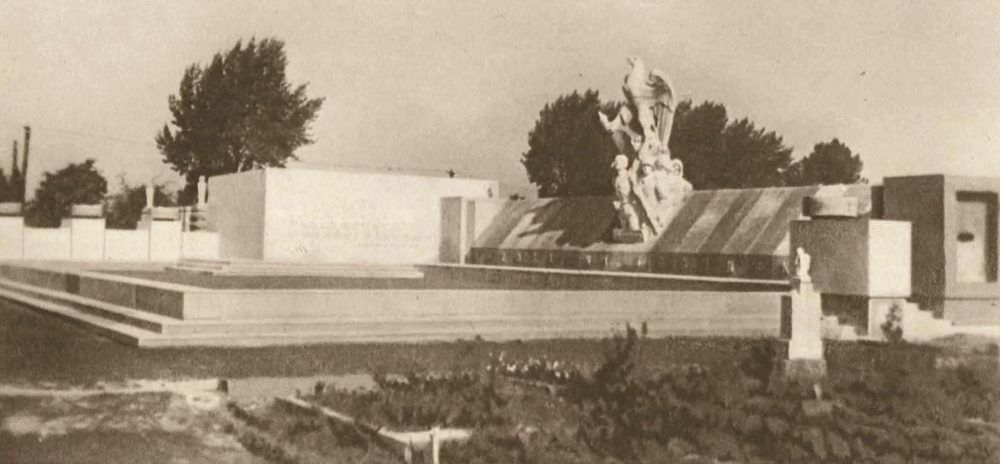
Original appearance of the monument

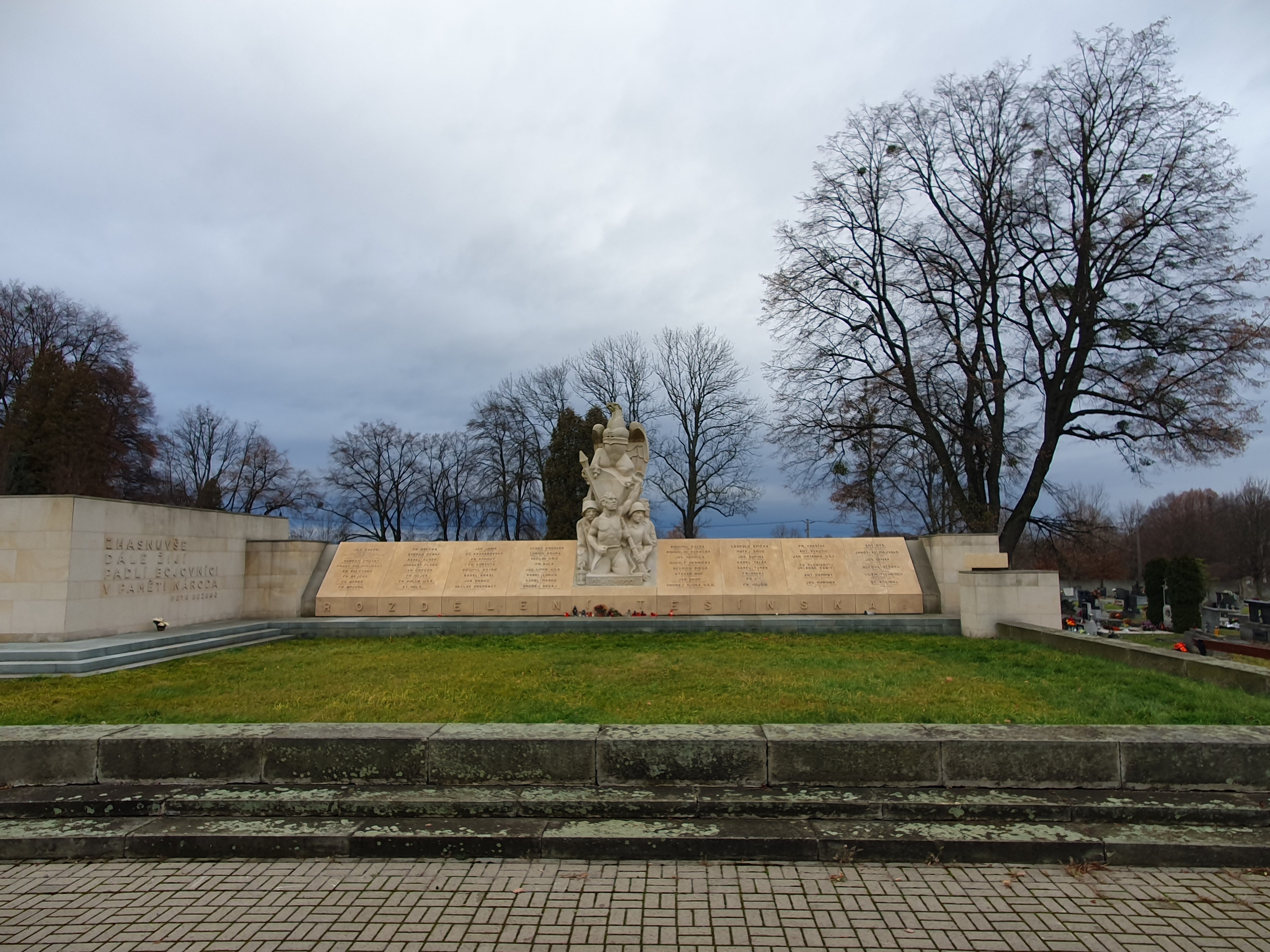
Current appearance of the monument

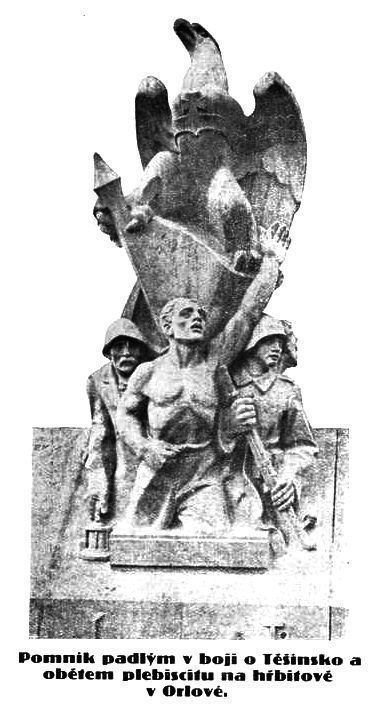
Sculpture with the Silesian eagle destroyed during the Polish annexation

Monument to fallen for Těšín Silesia (Czech: Pomník padlým za Těšínsko) is a monument in Orlová commemorating Czech victims of the Polish–Czechoslovak War and the following plebiscite period during the Polish–Czechoslovak dispute over Cieszyn Silesia (1919–1920).

The monument was built in 1928, damaged during the Polish annexation of the territory in 1938–1939 and after the end of the World War II partially reconstructed.

== Beginnings ==
Immediately after the Polish–Czechoslovak War started members of the Sokol in Orlová begun to organize material and financial gatherings to support wounded Czech soldiers and surviving relatives of the Czech soldiers fallen in the war. As gathered finances have accumulated a loose association named "Fund for the survivors and for construction of a monument commemorating fallen for Těšín Silesia with a seat in Orlová" (Czech: Fond pro pozůstalé a pro zbudování pomníku padlým za Těšínsko se sídlem v Orlové) was created. The goal of the Fund was the organisation of welfares the proceeds of which would be used to support families of the fallen soldiers and to maintain graves of the soldiers on the Orlová cemetery.

In time the main goal of the Fund became construction of a representative monument commemorating the fallen soldiers. Already in 1919 a provisional wooden monument was erected on the Orlová cemetery. At the beginning of 1922 the Fund together with the "Sokol district of Těšín Silesia of Jan Čapek" (Czech: Sokolská župa Těšínská Jana Čapka) initiated exhumation and transfer to Orlová of the remains of 22 legionnaires and soldiers buried in what was now the Polish part of Cieszyn Silesia (in Cieszyn and Pruchna). In July the remains of Jan Čapek were ceremonially buried on the Orlová cemetery. Next to Jan Čapek there were buried in total further 55 soldiers fallen in the Polish–Czechoslovak War or the following plebiscite period. Each year on 1 November a commemorative celebration took place next to the graves.

In 1924 the Fund transformed into an association and its name changed to "Association to honour the fallen for Těšín Silesia" (Czech: Spolek pro poctu padlých za Těšínsko). Its goals remained unchanged.

== Construction ==
In October 1924 the Association announced an anonymous competition for a proposal of a monument commemorating the fallen for Těšín Silesia. Out of 39 proposals in total the five-member committee chose three. First prize went to the proposal "Green exclamation mark over Orlová" (Czech: Zelený vykřičník nad Orlovou) of the architects Stránský and Šlégl and the academic sculptor Václav Žaluda. In March 1924 the Association obtained financial support from the Resistance Memorial in Prague. On 7 March a competition for construction works was announced. Financial gatherings were constantly taking place. In January 1927 the 34th infantry regiment of „Gunner Jan Čapek“ of the Czechoslovak Army became a founding member of the Association and it helped the Association by gatherings and organisation of military band concerts.

The monument was erected in 1928. The sculpture with the Silesian eagle was made of sandstone by the sculptor Ferdinand Malina of Orlová. The architectural part was made by the constructor, architect and a former Italian legionnary Čeněk Volný of Doubrava. The construction oversight was conducted by the authors of the project Stránský, Šlégl and Žalud. The monument was unfolded on 30 September 1928.

The Association ceased its activities after settling all of its obligations by a decision of its liquidation general meeting on 26 May 1938. The administration of the monument was transferred to the "Sokol district of Těšín Silesia of Jan Čapek" (Czech: Sokolská župa Těšínská Jana Čapka) and the "Moravian-Silesian district of the Czechoslovak Legionnary Community" (Czech: Moravskoslezská župa Československé obce legionářské).

== Damage ==
During the Polish annexation of Trans-Olza in October 1938 – August 1939 the monument was damaged, in particular the sculpture with the Silesian eagle. The damaged sculpture was not restored after the end of the World War II. It was not renewed until 2024.
