= Balladyna (drama) =

Play by Juliusz Słowacki

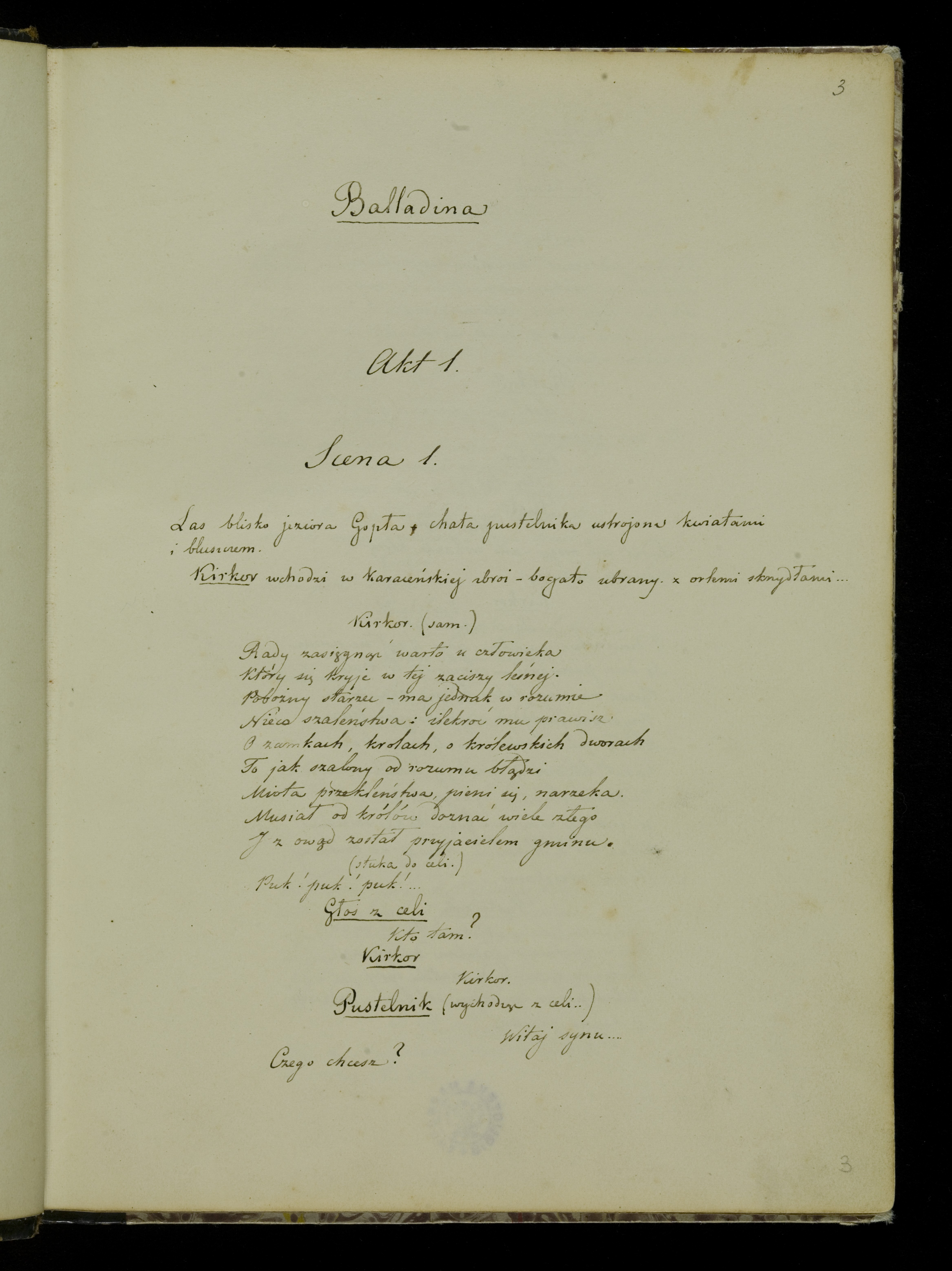
- The manuscript of Balladyna given by Słowacki to friend Józef Reitenheim in 1834
- Author: Juliusz Słowacki
- Language: Polish
- Genre: Drama
- Publication date: 1834
- Publication place: Switzerland

Balladyna is a drama written by Juliusz Słowacki in 1834 in Geneva and published in 1839 in Paris. It is a notable work of Polish romanticism, focusing on the issues such as thirst for power and evolution of the criminal mind. The story revolves around the rise and fall of Balladyna, a fictional Slavic queen.

One of the most famous and controversial stagings of Balladyna took place in 1974 at the Grand Theatre in Warsaw. It was directed by Adam Hanuszkiewicz with Anna Chodakowska playing the title role. The story was set as an opera, Goplana, in 1897.

Balladyna was performed as tragi-comedy in English for the first time in the United Kingdom in November 2018 by Passing Stranger Theatre Company at Drayton Arms Theatre in Kensington, London and directed by Emma Blacklay-Piech, with a Polish actress Anna Krauze in title role.

From May 2024, a fair copy of Balladyna, given by Słowacki to friend Józef Reitenheim in 1834, is presented at a permanent exhibition in the Palace of the Commonwealth.

== Power and ethics in tragedy ==
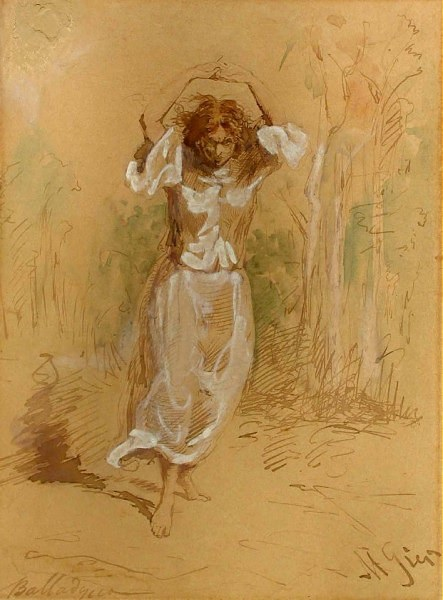
Balladyna by Maksymilian Gierymski, 1868

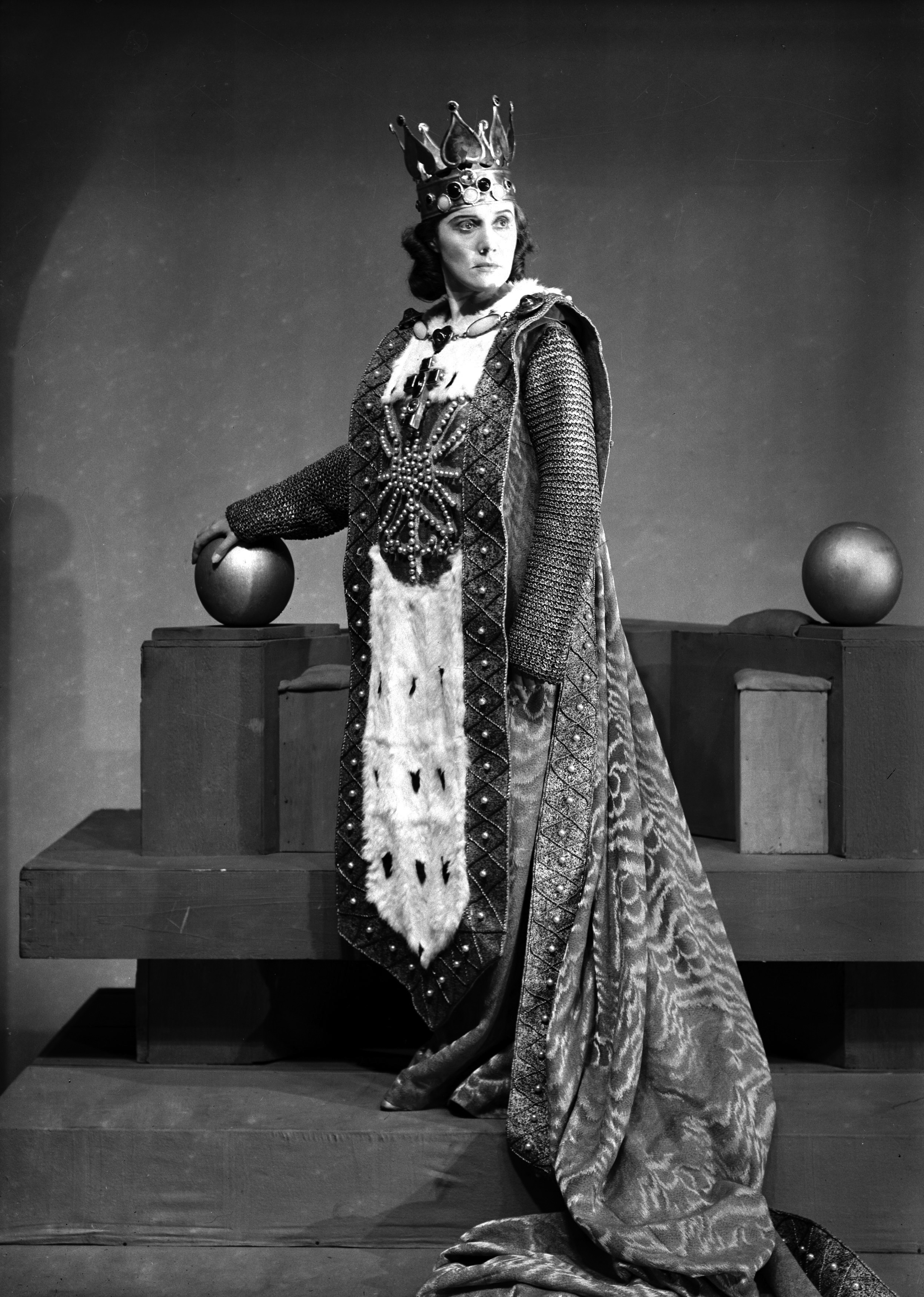
Zofia Jaroszewska in the role of Balladyna, 1938

Balladyna has been compared to Macbeth, both being dramas which show how evil and prone to suggestion human nature is. In both cases, the author claims that it is impossible to righteously rule a country if power was gained unlawfully.

In the play, the author creates a psychological portrait of a woman who starts to be overwhelmed by her passionate pursuit of power leading to her inevitable downfall. The work features elements of horror and the supernatural, pathos and grotesque as well as lyricism and mockery. According to Maria Janion, Balladyna is "the embodiment of the tragic irony of Romanticism".

== Characters ==
- Balladyna – the main protagonist of the play, the daughter of a poor widow, pampered and favoured by her mother. She is ruthless in her pursuit of power. She marries Prince Kirkor and is also Grabiec's and Fon Kostryn's lover, both of whom she kills. She brings upon herself a death sentence as a result of her actions. She has black hair, dark eyes and pale, white skin.
- Alina – Balladyna's younger sister. She is an honest, kind-hearted and hard-working girl, prone to jokes and laughter. She dearly loves her mother and sister but is killed by the latter when Balladyna loses a raspberry picking contest with her to marry Kirkor. She is a very beautiful girl who wears her blond hair in a long plait, she has blue eyes and rosy cheeks.
- Widow – Alina and Balladyna's mother. She is an old woman who was expelled from the castle in the past. She favours Balladyna over her younger sister. She gets blinded by lightning and dies in torture when she refuses to reveal the name of her evil daughter, which would result in sentencing Balladyna to death.
- Kirkor – a rich prince who, on the advice of the Hermit, is looking for a poor peasant girl for his wife. He wants to restore the rightful King Popiel III (the Hermit) to the Gniezno throne. He dies in battle against the armies of Balladyna and Fon Kostryn.
- Hermit – King Popiel III. He was overthrown and exiled from the castle by his brother who ordered to kill Popiel's children while he ascended the throne in Gniezno. He is killed on the orders of Balladyna.
- Grabiec – son of a local verger, a drunk, Balladyna's lover and Goplana's object of love. He witnesses the death of Alina and is among the guests at Balladyna and Kirkor's wedding. He gets killed in his sleep by Balladyna and Fon Kostryn.
- Goplana – a nymph and Queen of Gopło. She falls in love with Grabiec and saves his life by helping him get out of the lake.
- Skierka – Goplana's faithful servant. He mistakenly casts a spell on Prince Kirkor who, as a consequence, falls in love with both Balladyna and Alina.
- Fon Kostryn – one of Kirkor's knights who falsely claims to be the son of a German Graf. He is supposed to look after Balladyna when the prince is away but instead he becomes her lover. He is later killed by Balladyna.
- Filon – a shepherd who is hopelessly looking for love. He finds Alina's dead body and falls in love with her.
- Chochlik – Goplana's lazy and dishonest servant.
- Gralon – Kirkor's envoy.
- Wawel – a chronicler. He talks to the audience in the epilogue of the play. According to some literary scholars his character might personify Joachim Lelewel.

== Plot ==
Balladyna opens with a young prince Kirkor consulting with a Hermit on whom to marry. The Hermit reveals that he was formerly King Popiel III, who was deposed by his brother who also murdered his three children. However, when exiled he was able to bring the true ancient crown of Poland with him. Kirkor swears to raise an army and restore the throne to him. The Hermit considers women untrustworthy and advises Kirkor to find a plain cottage and to marry a poor girl as he will be happier that way.

Balladyna and Alina are sisters who live with their mother in a poor hut in the middle of a forest. Goplana – the nymph queen of the Lake Gopło - is in love with Balladyna's beloved, Grabiec, and because of her jealousy she intervenes in peoples' lives and changes their destiny. The sisters’ hut is visited by the rich Kirkor, who was led there by Skierka, Goplana's servant. Goplana wanted Kirkor to fall in love with Balladyna so that Grabiec could be hers alone, but Skierka made a mistake and Kirkor fell in love with both sisters. He also believes that this proves the Hermit's advice was good to marry a poor girl.

The sisters compete to marry Kirkor by collecting raspberries. When Balladyna finds out that Alina is winning, she kills her with a knife. The only witness is Grabiec, whom Goplana turns into a weeping willow to prevent him from telling anyone about the murder. After returning home, Balladyna claims that her sister ran away with a lover. The only things reminding Balladyna of the crime she committed are a bloody stain on her forehead that cannot be removed, pangs of remorse and terrible nightmares. The body of the dead girl is found by Filon, who falls in love with her.

Soon after the marriage, Kirkor leaves for the battle of Gniezno and wedding guests come to the castle. Balladyna is so ashamed of her mother that she orders the servants to lock her in a tower. During Kirkor's absence, Balladyna and Kirkor's knight, Fon Kostryn, fall in love. Balladyna decides to visit the Hermit hoping that he will remove the bloody stain. The perceptive Hermit soon discovers Balladyna's deeds and sends her away. With the Hermit distracted by this, Goplana's servants find and steal his crown. Kostryn, to prove his loyalty to Balladyna, aids her in killing a messenger sent by Kirkor with presents for his wife.

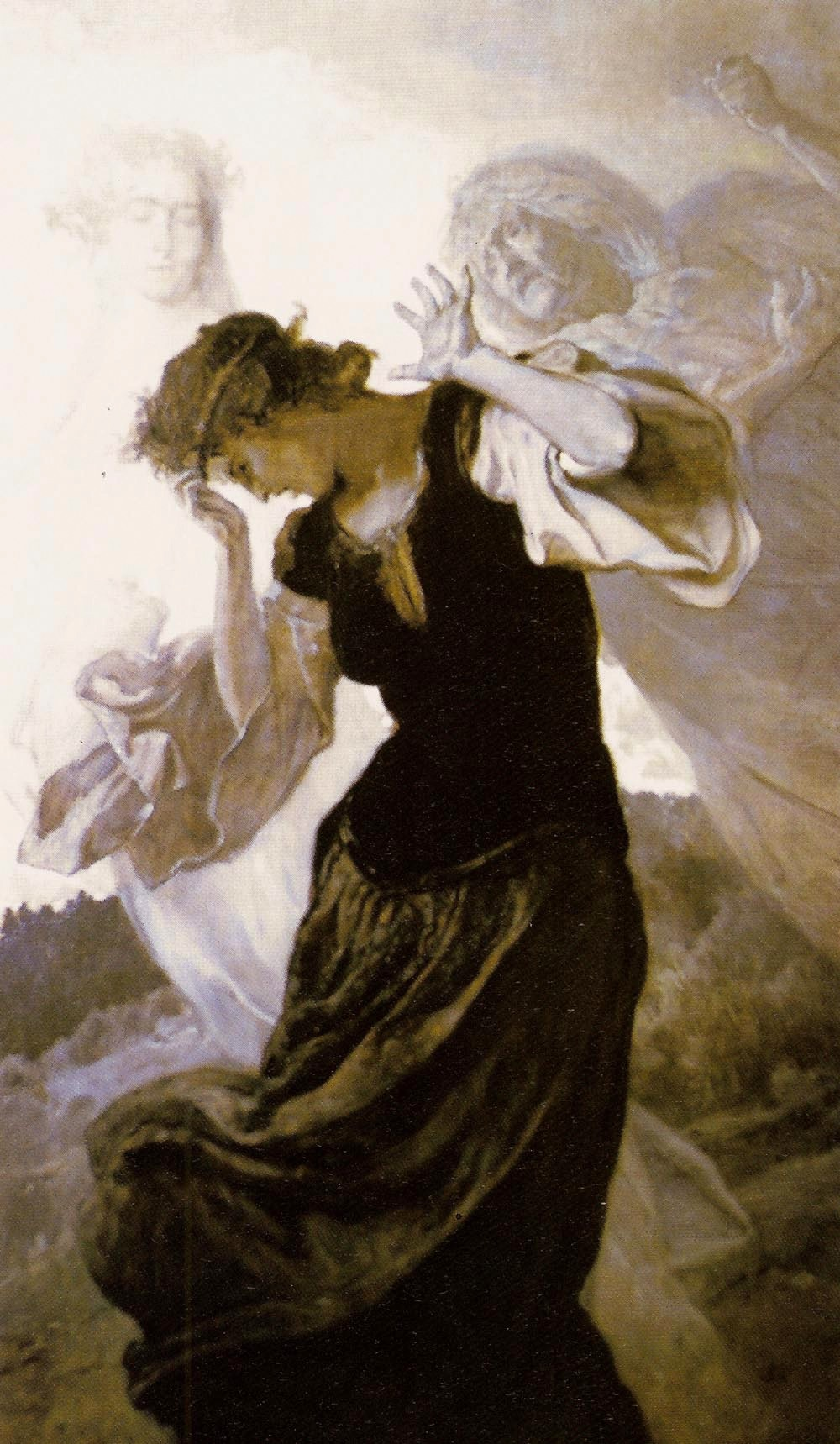
Balladyna by Wojciech Gerson, 1900

In the castle, a feast takes place, with the guests including Grabiec (dressed as the King of Bells [in English Diamonds], wearing the Hermit's/Popiel's crown), and the nymphs Skierka and Chochlik. Balladyna disavows her mother and exiles her from the castle. When hearing Chochlik's song detailing her felonies, Balladyna goes mad. She hears voices from beyond, sees the ghost of her sister and finally passes out. In the middle of the night, Balladyna and Kostryn kill Grabiec and take the crown – the symbol of legitimate royal rule – and leave for Gniezno to seize power. Balladyna orders that the Hermit be killed.

Fon Kostryn defeats Kirkor's army in battle and Kirkor dies on the battlefield. Soon after, Balladyna gives Kostryn a piece of bread sliced with a poisoned knife. Kostryn dies in agony, warning against Balladyna's rule with his dying breath.

Balladyna becomes the queen. The chancellor informs her that, as a new monarch, she should decide on some of the cases pleaded by her subjects. The first case concerns the poisoning of Kostryn and Balladyna is forced to sentence an unknown man to death. The next case regards the death of Alina and another unknown innocent is sentenced to death.

At that moment Balladyna's mother enters the palace, blinded by lightning and complaining about her daughter who drove her out of the castle during the storm and who refused to have anything to do with her. She refuses to name Balladyna and is killed during torture. Forced by the chancellor, Balladyna issues a third death sentence for the daughter. The triple punishment on Balladyna is carried out by God himself, who strikes the evil queen with lightning, killing her.

== Adaptations and notable stagings of the play ==
- In 1896, Władysław Żeleński composed an opera Goplana to a Polish libretto by Ludomił German which is based on Słowacki's play.
- In 1968, Jeremi Przybora staged a comical musical Balladyna 68 to music by Jerzy Wasowski, an adaptation of the play performed at the Teatr Nieduży in Warsaw. The musical follows Balladyna describing the events of the play in a drastically different way than they were presented in the original text; characters are aware of them being just the characters of a tragedy and often refer directly to Juliusz Słowacki.
- In 1974, Adam Hanuszkiewicz directed arguably the most famous staging of the play at the Grand Theatre in Warsaw with Anna Chodakowska in title role.
- In 1994, Jarosław Kiljan staged The Balladyna Fairy Tale at the Powszechny Theatre in Warsaw with Dorota Landowska in title role.
- In 2009, Dariusz Zawiślak directed a film Balladyna starring Faye Dunaway, a contemporary adaptation of Juliusz Słowacki's play. The film was shot to commemorate the 200th anniversary of the poet's birth.
- In 2018, the British premiere of the play took place at Drayton Arms Theatre in Kensington, London. It was directed by Emma Blacklay-Piech, with a Polish actress Anna Krauze in title role.
- In 2023, the Ukrainian premiere of the play took place at Central Artists House stage in Kyev. It was directed by Oleg Primogenov of Golden Taurus Misterium Theater, with a Ukrainian actress Katerina Galichenko in title role.

== See also ==
- Polish literature
- Romanticism in Poland
- Three Bards

== Sources ==
- Balladyna by Juliusz Słowacki
