= Poppleton =

Poppleton may refer to:

== Places ==
- Upper Poppleton, North Yorkshire, England
- Nether Poppleton, North Yorkshire, England
- Poppleton railway station, North Yorkshire, England
- Poppleton, Baltimore, a neighborhood of Baltimore, Maryland
- Poppleton Township, Minnesota, United States

== People ==
- Earley F. Poppleton (1834–1899), a politician in Ohio, United States
- Andrew Jackson Poppleton (1830–1896), mayor of Omaha, Nebraska, United States

== Other ==
- Poppleton School, a former school in Troy, Michigan, now at the Troy Historic Village
- Poppleton (book series), a series of children's books about a pig named Poppleton
- Poppleton manuscript, a 14th-century codex
