= Goplana (opera) =

Opera by Władysław Żeleński

- Opera by Władysław Żeleński
- Librettist: Ludomił German
- Language: Polish
- Based on: Balladyna by Juliusz Słowacki
- Premiere: 23 July 1896; 129 years ago Kraków

Goplana is an 1896 Polish opera by Władysław Żeleński, to a Polish libretto by Ludomil German based on the 1839 drama Balladyna by Juliusz Słowacki.

== Plot ==
The folk tale plot follows closely Juliusz Słowacki's original drama and concerns the brutal fate of several humans - principally the sisters Balladyna and Alina - after the nymph Goplana interferes in their affairs.

== Recording ==
DVD Goplana Soloists, Polish National Opera, Grzegorz Nowak, Frederick Chopin Institute 2021
