= Andrzej Popiel =

Polish actor (1936–2020)

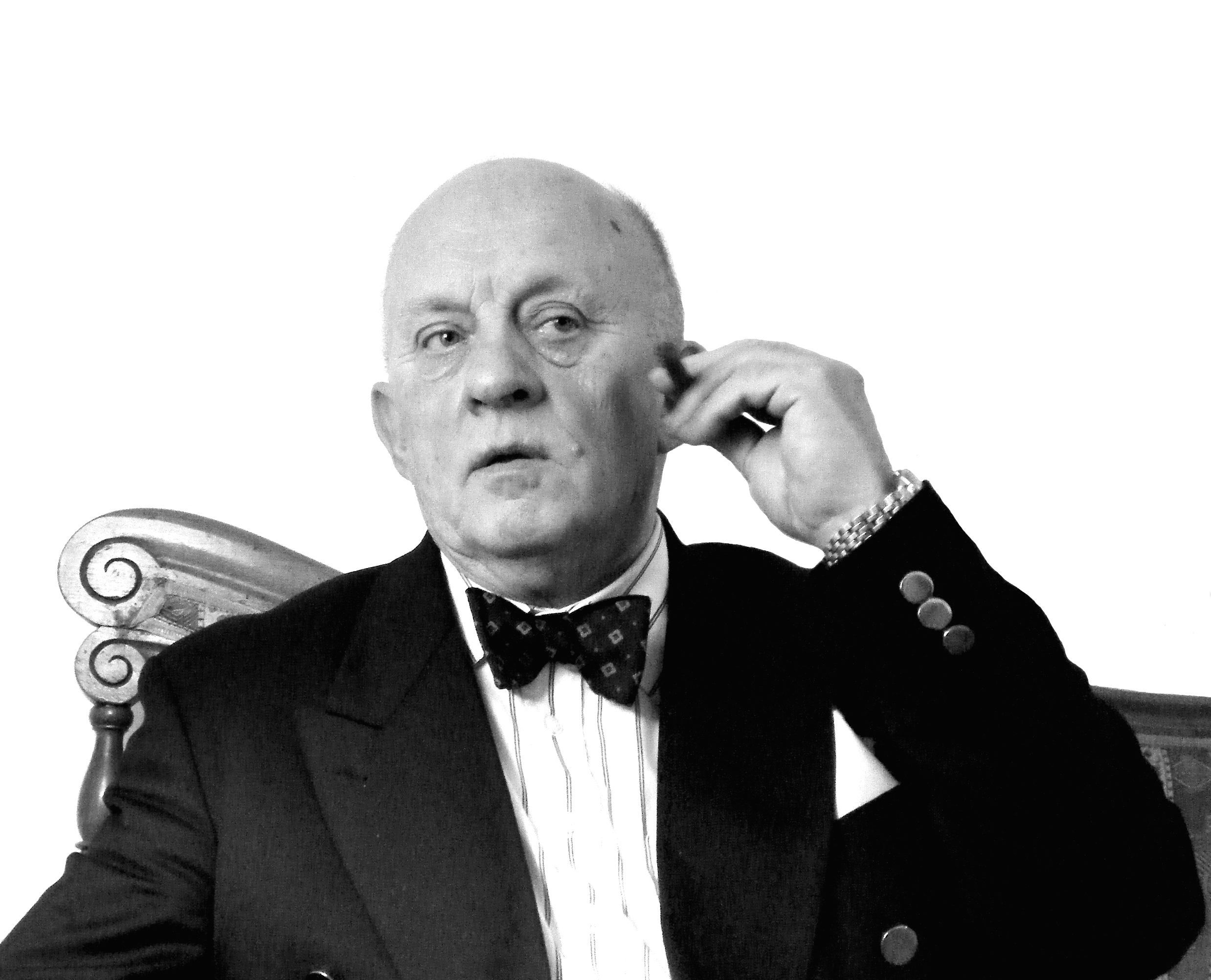
- Andrzej Popiel, 2012
- Born: 24 January 1936; Kraków
- Died: 17 February 2020 (aged 84)
- Citizenship: Polish
- Occupation: actor

Andrzej Popiel, 2014

Andrzej Popiel (24 January 1936 – 17 February 2020) was a Polish stage actor who sporadically appeared in films and television series.

== Biography ==
He was a son of Kazimierz Popiel and Anna née Latinik, and a grandson of Franciszek Latinik, and great-great-grandson of Jan Wilhelm Hiż.

He was awarded the Brown Medal of Merit for National Defence (1971) and Silver Cross of Merit (1989).

== Theatre (selection) ==
- 1961: Wesoły telewizor (Estrada Kraków)
- 1973: Kariera Nikodema Dyzmy (The Career of Nicodemus Dyzma, Music Theatre in Łódź) as Litwinek
- 1975, 1983: Madame Sans-Gene (Music Theatre in Gdynia) as Kirkeby
- 1984: Fiddler on the Roof (Music Theatre in Gdynia, directed by Jerzy Gruza) as a rabbi
- 1991: Pan Tadeusz (Municipal Theatre in Gdynia, directed by Adam Hanuszkiewicz) as a chamberlain
- 1993: Fiddler on the Roof (Grand Theatre in Warsaw, directed by Jerzy Gruza) as a rabbi

Source.

== Filmography ==
- 1984: Smażalnia story
- 1986: Na kłopoty Bednarski (TV)
- 2002, 2003: Lokatorzy (TV)
- 2004, 2007: Sąsiedzi (TV)
- 2006: Outlanders

Source.
