= Franciszek Latinik =

Polish military officer (1864–1949)

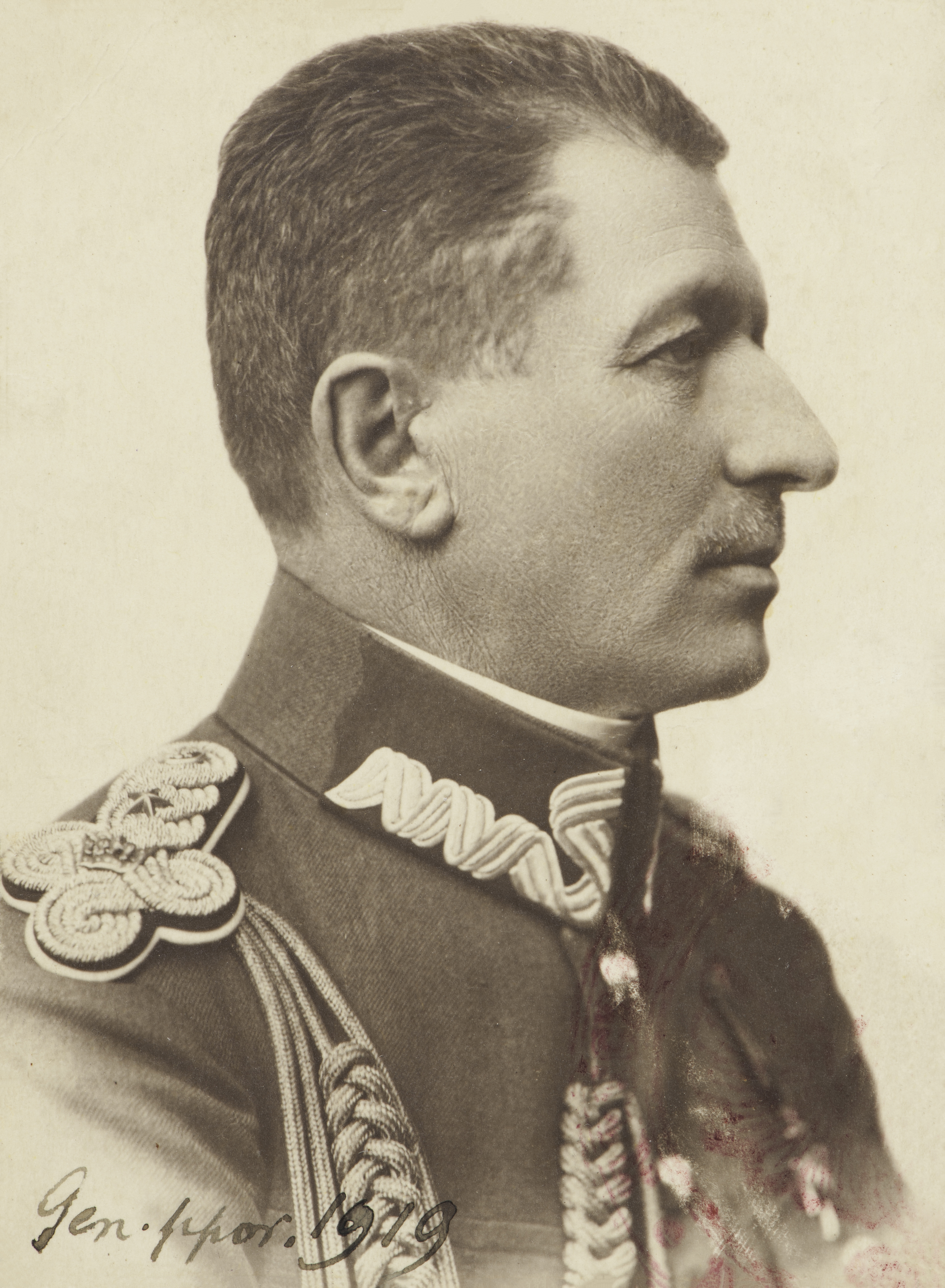
- Born: Franciszek Ksawery Latinik; 17 July 1864; Tarnów, Austrian Empire
- Died: 29 August 1949 (aged 85); Kraków, Poland
- Military career
- Allegiance: Austria-Hungary (1882–1918); Second Polish Republic (1918–1925)
- Branch: Austro-Hungarian Army; Polish Army
- Service years: 1882–1925
- Rank: Major general
- Conflicts: First World War; Polish–Czechoslovak War; Polish–Soviet War
- Awards: see below

Franciszek Ksawery Latinik (17 July 1864 – 29 August 1949) was a Polish military officer, Colonel of Austro-Hungarian Army and Major General of the Polish Army.

Graduate of the General Staff Academy in Vienna, from 1914 he was a commander of the 100th Infantry Regiment of Austria-Hungary, with whom he participated in May 1915 in the break-up of the Russian front in the Battle of Gorlice. From 1918 after Poland gained independence, he served in the Polish Army; in January 1919 he was the commander of Polish forces fighting in Cieszyn Silesia against the Czech offensive. During the Battle of Warsaw in 1920 he commanded the First Polish Army and served as the military governor of the city besieged by the Red Army.

== Biography ==
He was born as the son of Antoni Izydor Latinik, high school geography teacher and author of the work Jeografija Galicyi dla szkół ludowych (Geography of Galicia for the People's Schools), and Kornelia née Romer, daughter of Teofil Romer, nobleman and Kraków Uprising participant, and granddaughter of Ignacy Łempicki, the grandson of Jan Wilhelm Hiż.

In 1882 he graduated from the Cadets School in Łobzów (currently a part of Kraków) and started service in Austro-Hungarian Army. He studied at the Academy of the General Staff in Vienna (1889–1891), also serving in the line, the staffs of the units, and in the General Staff. In 1896 he was promoted to captain, and in 1909 to Major. In 1909–1913 he commanded his original Cadets School in Łobzów. He was the commanding officer of the reserve officer school, lecturer in tactics at the Officer School of Infantry. In 1911 he was awarded the rank of Lieutenant Colonel, and in 1913 he was transferred to the 1st Infantry Regiment in Opava to the deputy commander of the regiment.

After the outbreak of World War I he fought on the Eastern Front. He took part in the offensive towards Lublin, he fought near Annopol, Ratoszyn, Kraśnik, Rozwadów and Mielec. On September 17, 1914, he took over the command of the 100th Infantry Regiment of Austria-Hungary, with which he initially participated in fights at Nida. He then fought at the head of that unit in the Battle of Gorlice on 2–4 May 1915. On May 2, 1915, the Regiment participated in the attack on the Pustki Hill, which was one of the main positions of Russian forces north of the city and later in the pursuit actions. Also in 1915 Latinik was promoted to the Colonel. He then fought on the Romanian front.

In the spring of 1917 he was transferred to the Italian front, near Soča. In the autumn of this year, the brigade under his command took part in the offensive of Caporetto. From February 1918 he fought on the Tirol front and took command of the 8th Infantry Brigade. In June he was seriously injured.

After Poland gained independence in the second half of 1918, he joined the Polish Army. From November 1918 to January 1919 he was the commander of garrison Zamość and then the Military District in Cieszyn. In January 1919, he commanded the Polish troops during the Polish-Czechoslovak War with the Czech forces over Cieszyn Silesia, stabilizing the front. On May 22, 1919, he was appointed commander of the Cieszyn Front of the South-West Front and on 30 May 1919 he was appointed commander of the 6th Infantry Division. From October 13, 1919, to March 1920, he commanded the 7th Infantry Division and at the same time ilesian Front. By the decision of the Chief Commander of November 23, 1919, he was appointed Lieutenant General on December 1, 1919. From February to August 1920 he was a representative of the Polish Army in the Border and Plebiscite Commission in Cieszyn.

On August 5, 1920, in the face of Red Army pushing west, just few days before Battle of Warsaw, Latinik was appointed Military Governor of Warsaw by the Chief Commander Józef Piłsudski. The main task of the Governor was to fortify the Modlin–Zegrze–Warsaw triangle. The Governor was supervising local civil and military authorities and had the right to appoint civilians for war benefits and to give local administrative authorities instructions on security, public order and peace. The Governor's adjutants could have arrested all suspected persons, regardless of their military rank and position. Evacuation of military and civilian institutions was prepared in the event of the collapse of defense of the Warsaw pretext. The Governorate also dealt with food supplies for the city and set maximum prices for groceries in order to prevent speculation. At the same time Latinik served as the commander of the 1st Polish Army, repelling the Bolshevik blow to the city. He took part in the fights in the Northern Front, among others in Battle of Radzymin.

The Military Governorate of Warsaw was dissolved on September 23, 1920. During the pursuit after the Red Army, Latinik was the commander of the Southern Group of the 6th Army. On April 20, 1921, he was appointed the commander of General District „Kielce”. He took over the duties of the district commander on 14 May, after his transfer holiday, and held the position until the General District Command "Kielce" was liquidated. Between September 20 and October 9, 1921, he stayed in Poznań for "family affairs". At the command of the district commander, he was temporarily replaced by a lieutenant general Eugeniusz Pogorzelski.

From November 15, 1921, he commanded the District No. X Corps in Przemysl. In the years 1920–22 he was part of the First Interim Chapter of the Virtuti Militari Order.

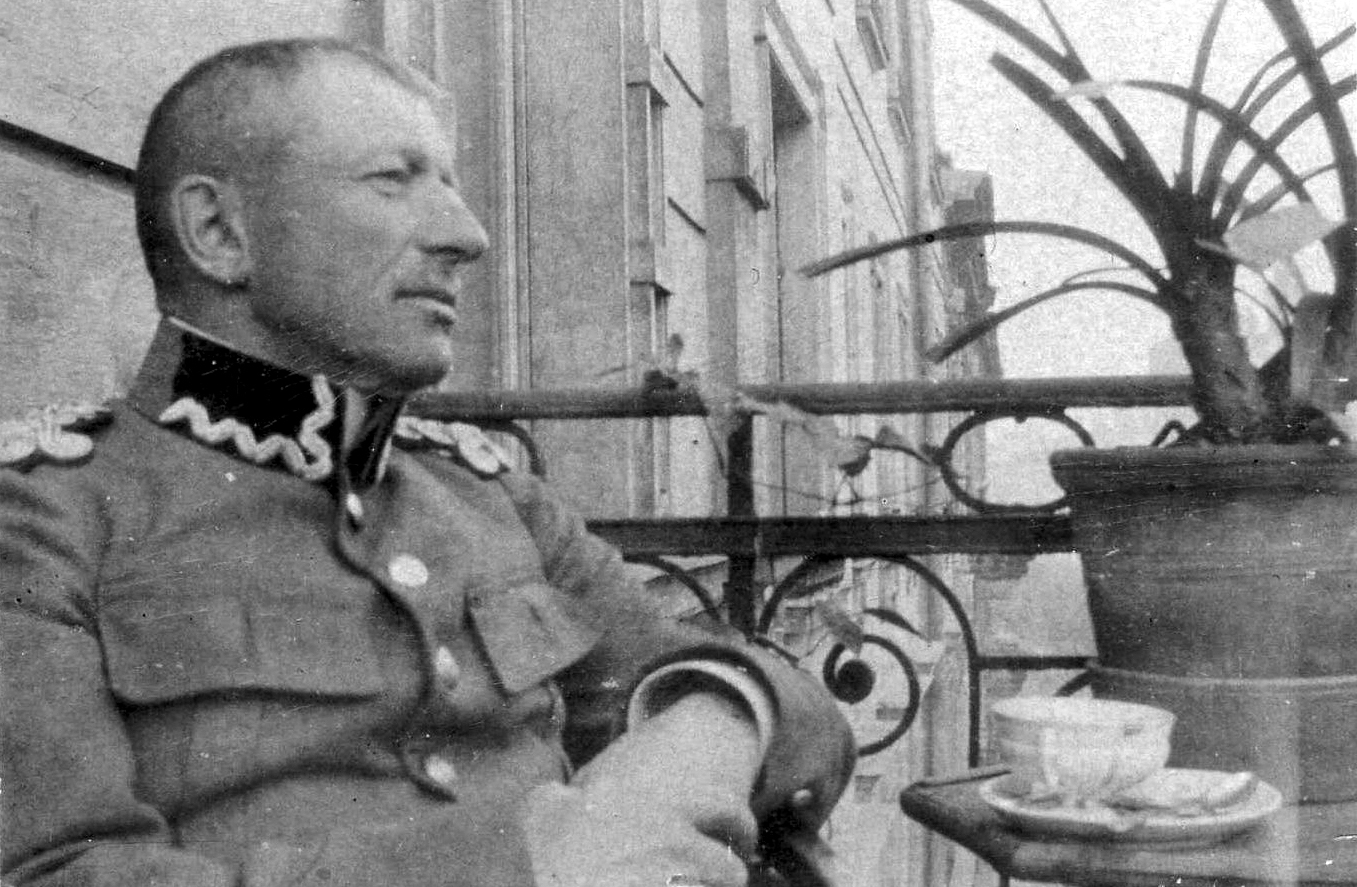
General Franciszek Ksawery Latinik after retiring at the balcony of his flat at Studencka Street in Kraków

He was an antagonist to Piłsudski, who criticized Latinik's activity in Przemyśl. (Note: Piłsudski said about Latinik: Laughly conceited, not satisfied with anything, even with himself, not fitting in any place in Poland, unjust to the subordinates, an intrigue maker, one of the generals spoiling Polish Army and almost unable to use. I would be glad if he was not in the Polish Army. See: Nierchyło, Andrzej (1988). "Wężyk generalski". Przegląd Tygodniowy. 30 (330): 15.) Latinik retired from active service in March 1925, after being conflicted with some former members of Polish Legions.

He lived in Kraków at the address Studencka Street 2. He was socially active, being a member of the "Development" Society. After the Second World War, at the age of 81, he founded and organized the Association of Military Returnees and Widows. Although he never engaged politically, he sympathized with the National Democracy; he had a guide of Kraków, in which only the shops belonging to Catholics were marked, as his grandson recalled: „Here and there, manually, grandfather marked a point and added word Jew”. He published several military memoir books, including Żołnierz polski pod Gorlicami 1915 (Polish Soldier at Gorlice, Przemyśl, 1923), Walka o Śląsk Cieszyński w r. 1919 (Fight for Teschen Silesia in year 1919), Bój o Warszawę. Rola wojskowego gubernatora i 1-ej armii w bitwie pod Warszawą w 1920 r. (Fight for Warsaw. The Role of the Military Governor and the 1st Army at the Battle of Warsaw in year 1920, Bydgoszcz, 1931) and a chapter Wspomnienie o generale broni Tadeuszu Rozwadowskim (The memory of General Tadeusz Rozwadowski) in a monograph dedicated to Tadeusz Rozwadowski (published in Kraków, 1929). He died in 1949 and was buried in the family tomb at the Rakowicki Cemetery.

== Family ==
In 1902 he married Helena Stiasny-Strzelbicka. They had three daughters: Anna (1902–1969), Irena (1904–1974) and Antonina (1906–1989), and six grandchildren: Irena and Andrzej Popiel, Janusz and Jerzy Rieger and Jerzy and Jan Vetulani.

== Dates of rank ==
=== Austro-Hungarian Army ===
- 1885: Second Lieutenant (Leutnant)
- 1889: Lieutenant (Oberleutnant)
- 1896: Captain (Rittmeister)
- 1909: Major (Major)
- 1911: Lieutenant Colonel (Oberstleutnant)
- 1915: Colonel (Oberst)

=== Polish Army ===
- 1919: Brigadier General (generał podporucznik)
- 1922: Major General (generał dywizji)

== Decorations and awards ==
Austria-Hungary

- Order of Leopold
- Order of the Iron Crown, 2nd class (1917)
- Order of Franz Joseph
- Military Merit Cross
- 1908 Jubilee Cross
- 1898 Jubilee Medal

Poland

- Virtuti Militari Silver Cross (1920)
- Polonia Restituta Commander's Cross (December 29, 1921)
- Cross of Valour (Krzyż Walecznych, twice - both in 1921)
- Memorial Medal for the War of 1918–1921
- Medal of the 10th Anniversary of Independence (1928)

Others

- Iron Cross (1st and 2nd class)
- Legion of Honour Officier's Cross
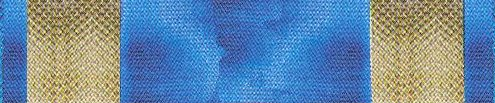
- Order of the Crown (Romania) Grand Cross

He refused to accept Military Order of Maria Theresa for venturesome attitude during battle of Gorlice, claiming that after Poland reclaimed independence, he may accept only distinctions from the Polish government.

== Memoirs ==
His memoirs were published in 2025.
