= Van Poppel =

Van Poppel is a Dutch toponymic surname, meaning "from Poppel", a village on the Belgian-Dutch border. Notable people with the surname include:

- Boy van Poppel (born 1988), Dutch racing cyclist, son of Jean-Paul
- Danny van Poppel (born 1993), Dutch racing cyclist, son of Jean-Paul
- Jean-Paul van Poppel (born 1962), Dutch racing cyclist
- Michael van Poppel (born 1989), Dutch journalist
- Todd Van Poppel (born 1971), American baseball player

== See also ==
- Poppel (disambiguation)
- Brooke Van Poppelen (born 1978), American comedian, actress, and writer
