= Balladyna (film) =

2009 film directed by Dariusz Zawiślak

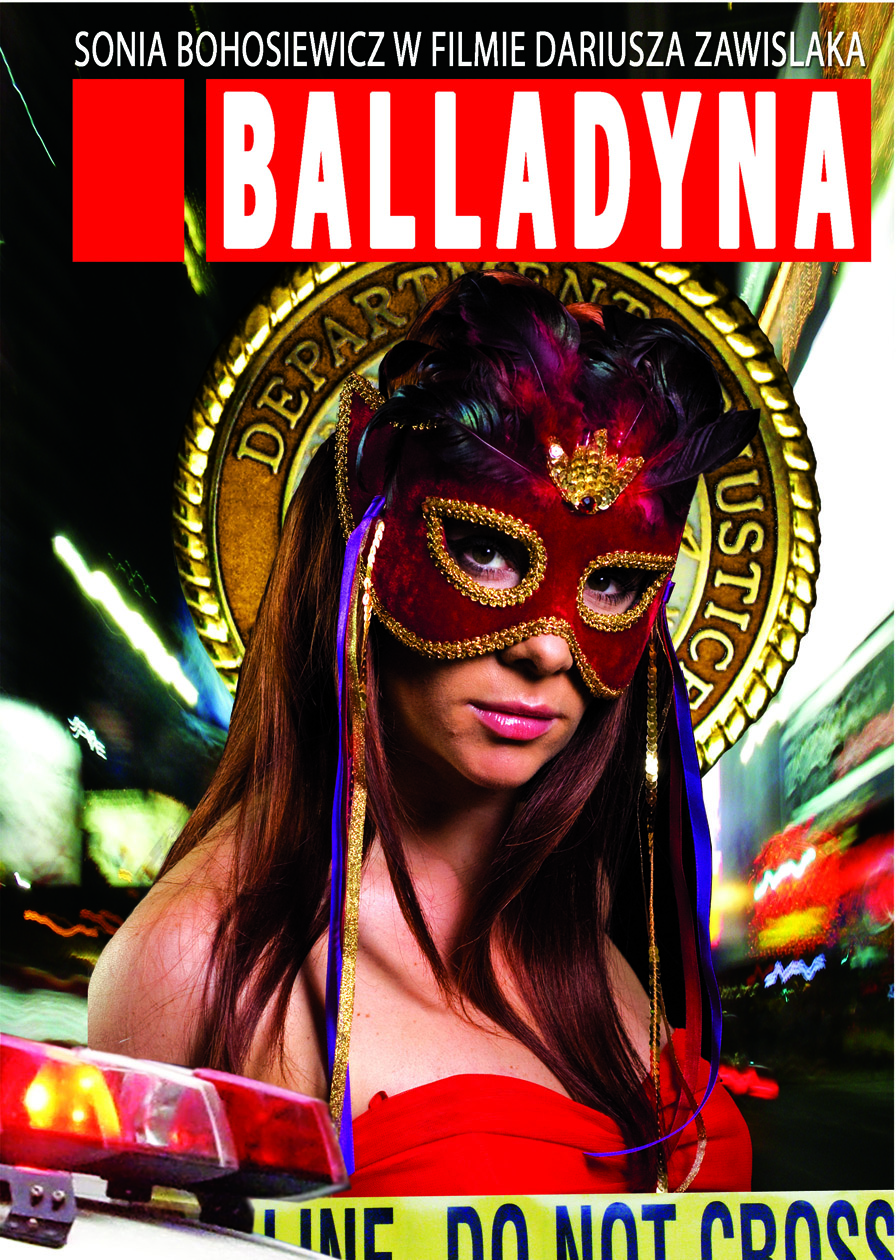
- Directed by: Dariusz Zawiślak
- Written by: Dariusz Zawiślak
- Produced by: Dariusz Zawiślak
- Music by: Chris Rafael
- Release date: 2009
- Running time: 90 minutes
- Countries: United States; Poland
- Languages: English, Polish

Balladyna aka The Bait is a 2009 Polish thriller, produced and directed by Dariusz Zawiślak.

== Plot ==
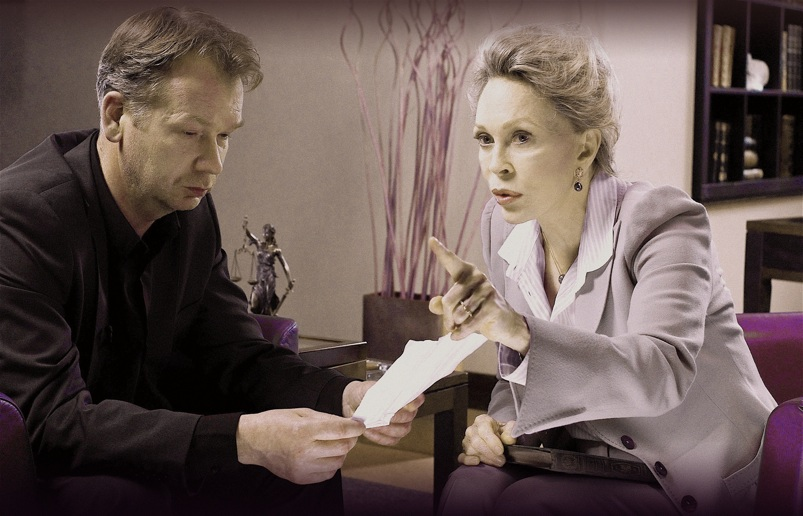
Faye Dunaway and Mirosław Baka in Balladyna by Dariusz Zawislak

The film is based on one of the dramas from the Epoch of the Romanticism - Balladyna, written in Geneva in 1834 (and published for the first time in Paris in 1839) by poet and dramatist Juliusz Słowacki. Although the original drama was influenced by William Shakespeare's plays King Lear, A Midsummer Night's Dream and Macbeth, Balladyna is an original romantic work. The plot is set at the time of Poland's origins. There is King Popiel, deprived of power by a usurper; the noble prince Kirkor, aiming to restore King Popiel's rule; the queen of the Gopło Lake and the elves; and two beautiful sisters, one good, the other bad. Balladyna, greedy for power, gains it through a number of crimes, including the killing of her sister Alina, the contender to marry Kirkor. In the finale Balladyna dies, struck by divine justice.

== Cast ==
- Faye Dunaway as dr Ash
- Sonia Bohosiewicz as Balladyna / Alina
- Mirosław Baka as Kirk
- Rafał Cieszyński as Chris
- Władysław Kowalski as Father
- Sławomir Orzechowski as Detevtive Ribb
- Stefan Friedmann as Mr. Lotter
- Tadeusz Borowski as doctor
- Magdalena Górska as lab technician
