= Poeppel =

Poeppel or Pöppel is a surname. Notable people with the surname include:

- Augustus Poeppel (1839–1891), Australian surveyor and explorer
- David Poeppel (born 1964), German psychologist
- Ernst Pöppel (born 1940), German psychologist and neuroscientist
- Johannes Poeppel (1921–2007), German Army general
