= List of Polish people =

This is a partial list of notable Polish or Polish-speaking or -writing people. People of partial Polish heritage have their respective ancestries credited.

== Physics ==
- Czesław Białobrzeski
- Andrzej Buras
- Georges Charpak, 1995 Nobel Prize
- Jan Kazimierz Danysz
- Marian Danysz
- Tomasz Dietl
- Maria Dworzecka, Polish-American computational nuclear physicist
- Artur Ekert, British-Polish, one of the independent inventors (in 1991) of quantum cryptography
- Krzysztof Gawedzki, mathematical physicist
- Marek Gazdzicki, high-energy nuclear physicist
- Ryszard Horodecki
- Leopold Infeld
- Aleksander Jabłoński
- Jerzy Stanisław Janicki
- Sylwester Kaliski
- Zygmunt Klemensiewicz
- Elżbieta Kossecka
- Jan Eugeniusz Krysiński
- Stanislas Leibler, Polish-French-American
- Maciej Lewenstein, theoretical physicist
- Olga Malinkiewicz
- Albert A. Michelson, American, 1907 Nobel Prize
- Lidia Morawska, Polish-Australian
- Stanisław Mrozowski
- Władysław Natanson
- Witold Nazarewicz, Polish-American nuclear physicist
- Henryk Niewodniczański
- Georges Nomarski
- Karol Olszewski
- Jerzy Plebański, theoretical physicist
- Jerzy Pniewski
- Nikodem Popławski, theoretical physicist
- Sylwester Porowski, blue laser
- Józef Rotblat, 1995 Nobel Peace Prize
- Stefan Rozental, nuclear physicist
- Wojciech Rubinowicz, theoretical physicist
- Maria Skłodowska Curie (Marie Curie), two Nobel Prizes
- Jan Sładkowski
- Marian Smoluchowski, kinetic theory, Einstein–Smoluchowski relation
- Andrzej Sobolewski
- Haroun Tazieff, geologist, volcanologist, cinematographer, writer and French Cabinet minister
- Andrzej Trautman, mathematical physicist
- Witelo, philosopher, medieval optics
- August Witkowski
- Romuald Niszcz
- Stanley Wojcicki, Polish-American
- Mieczysław Wolfke
- Stanisław Lech Woronowicz, theoretical physicist
- Zygmunt Wróblewski
- Marek Żukowski, theoretical physicist
- Wojciech H. Zurek, theoretical physicist
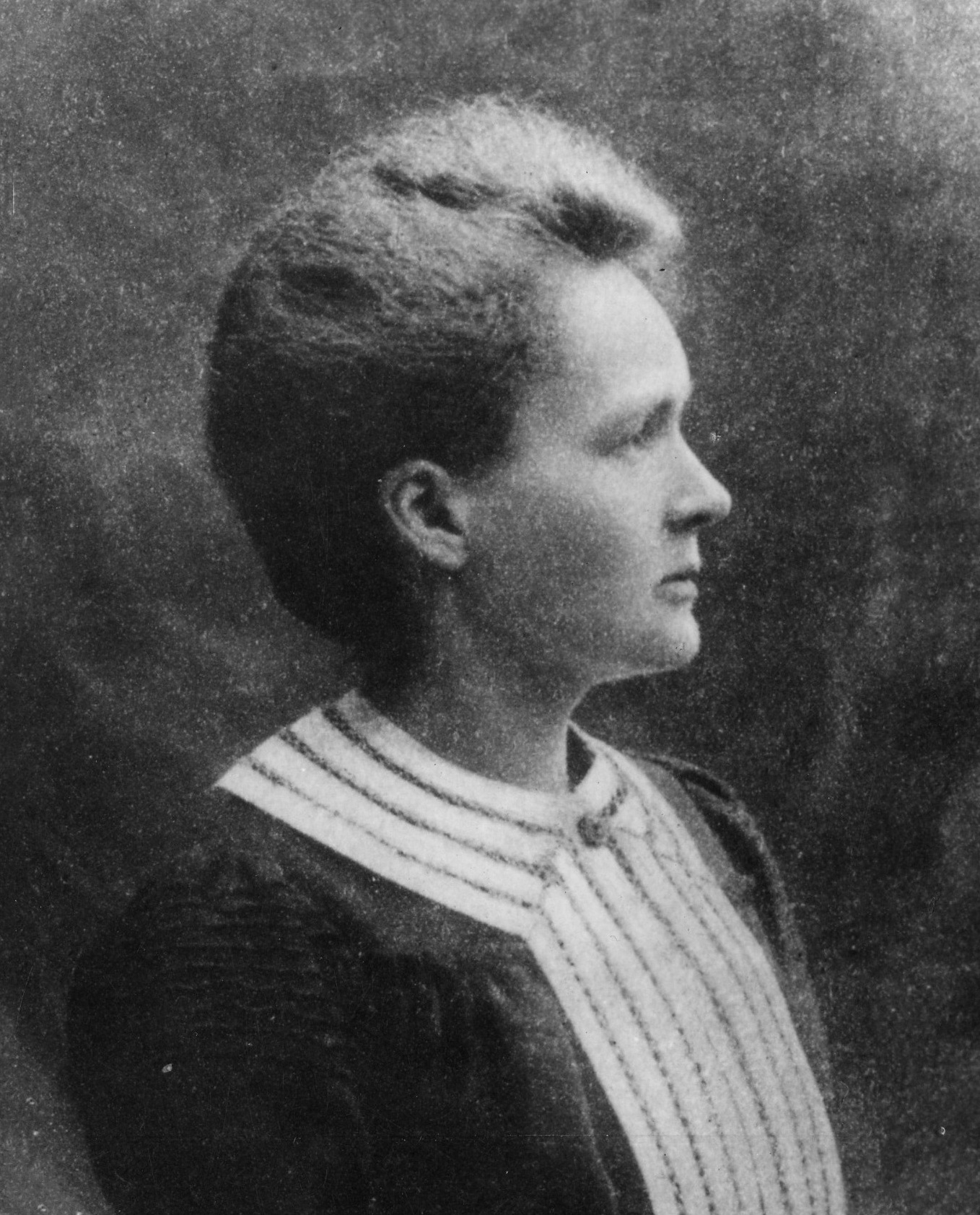
Skłodowska Curie

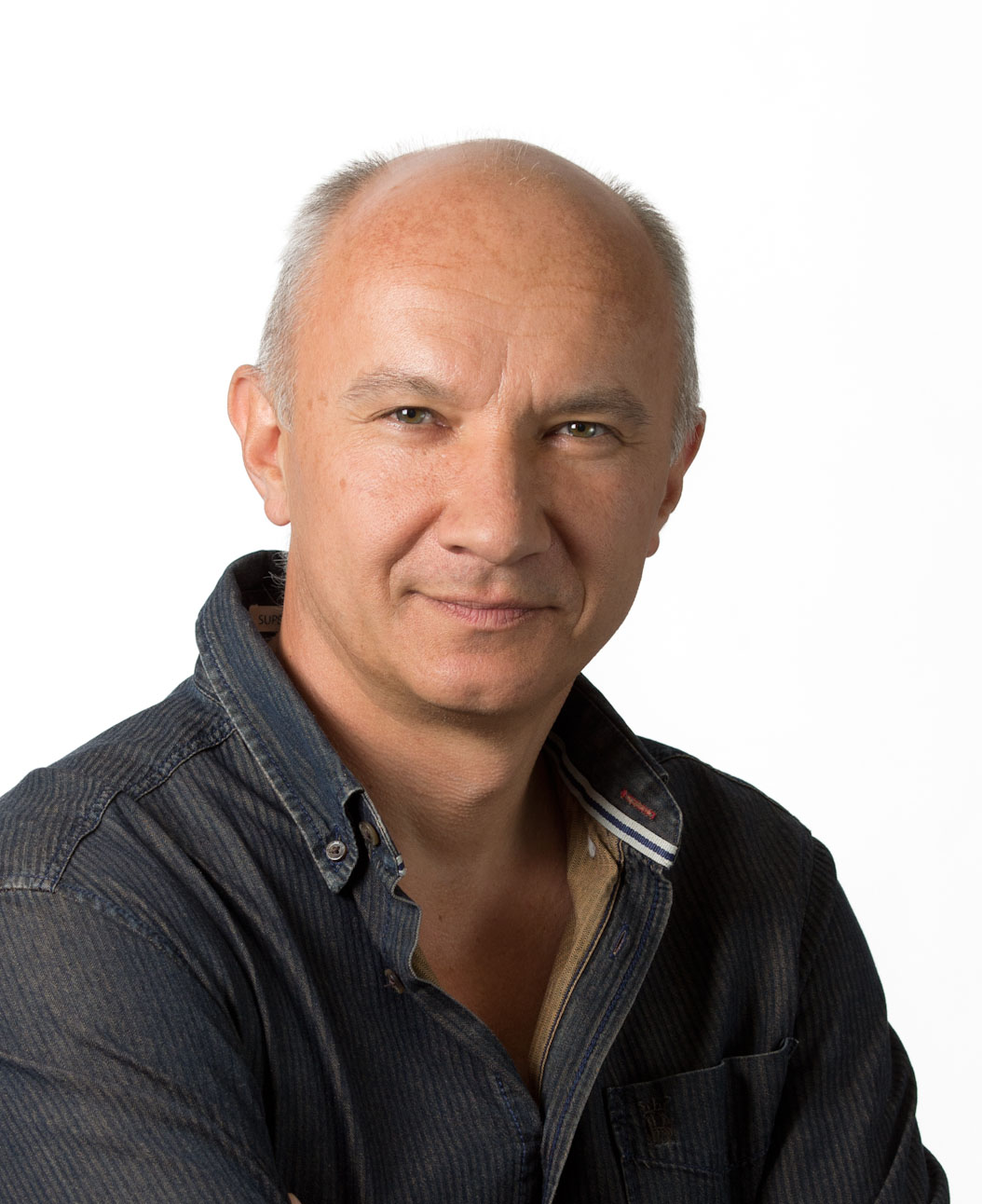
Ekert

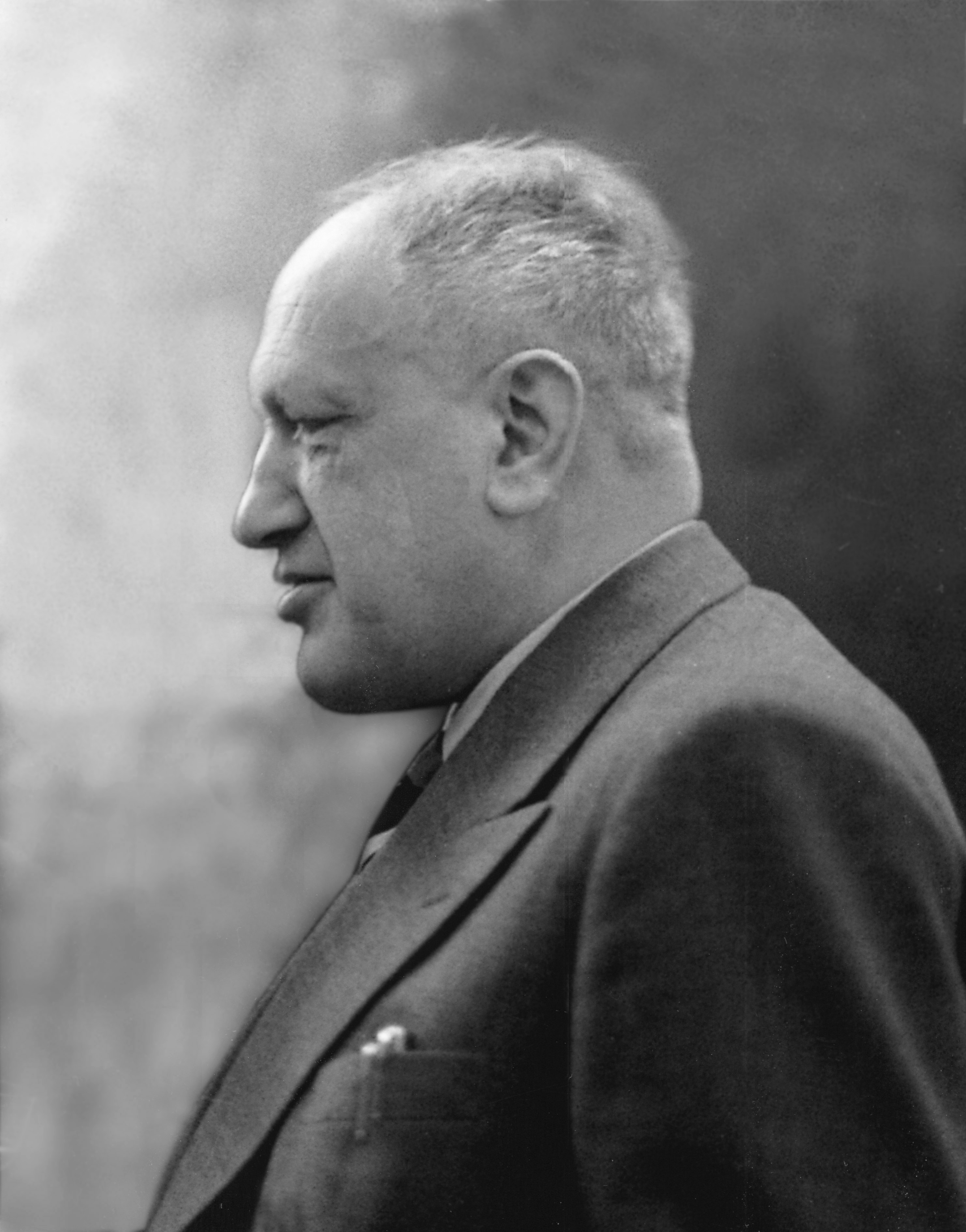
Infeld

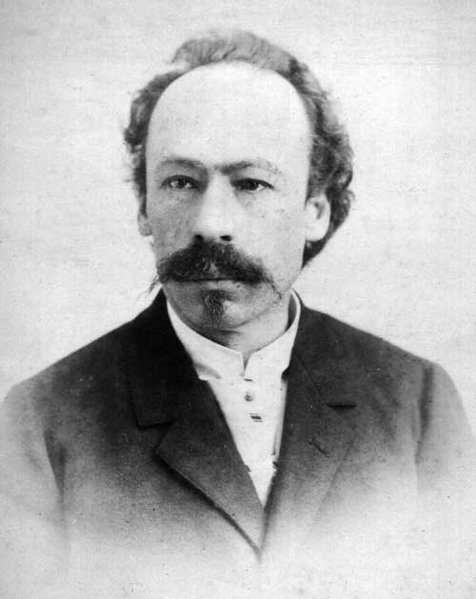
Olszewski

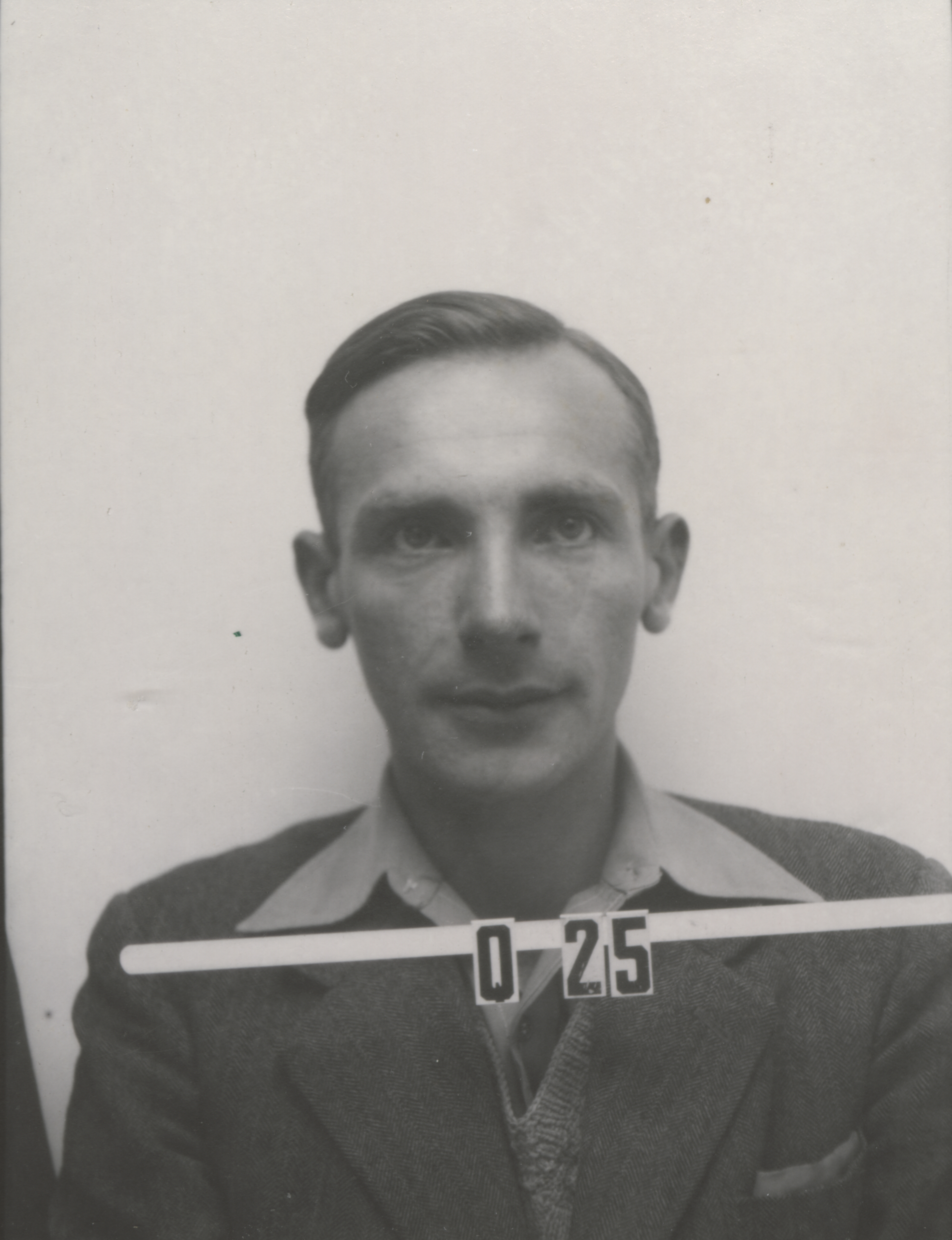
Rotblat

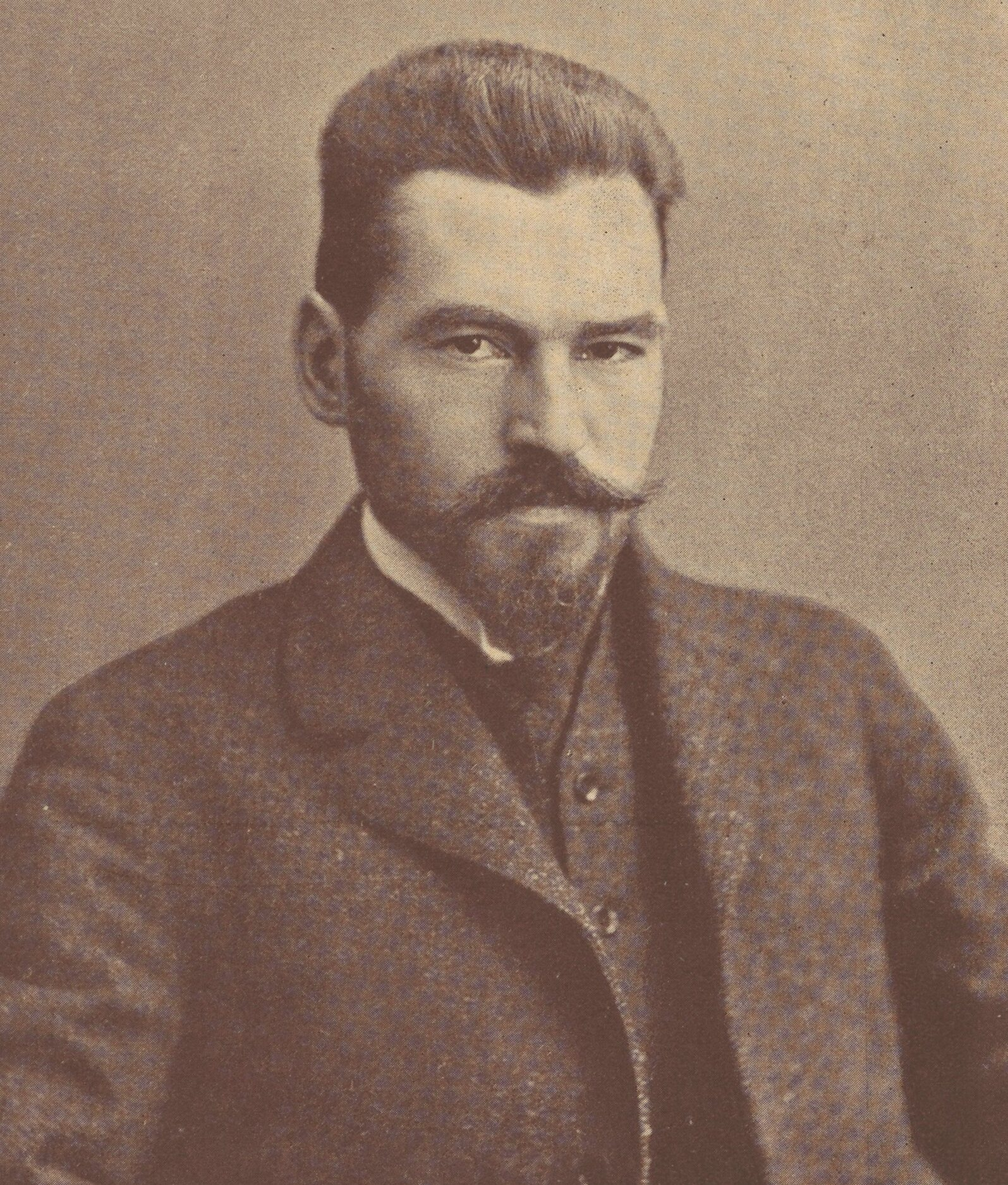
Smoluchowski

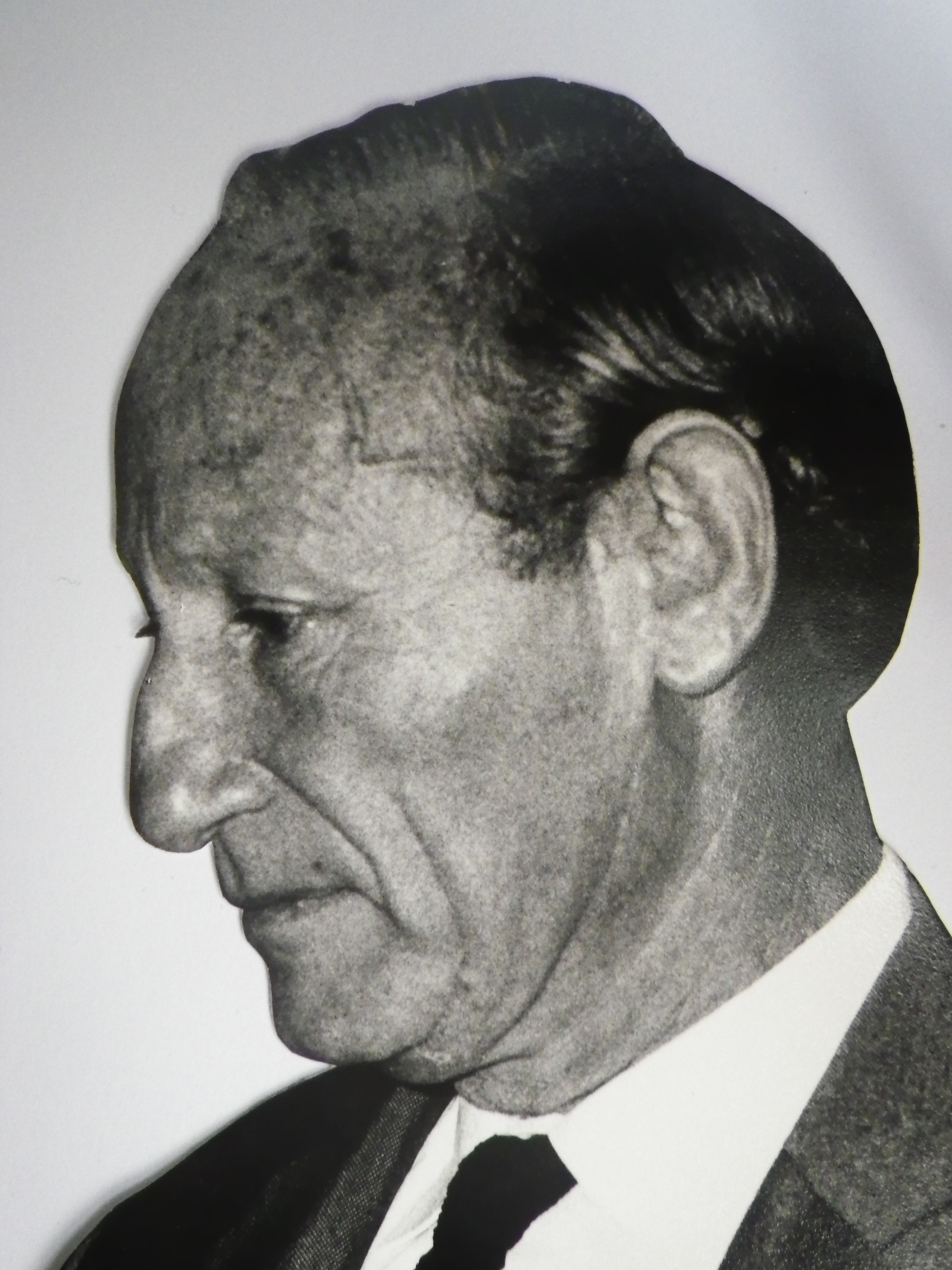
Tazieff

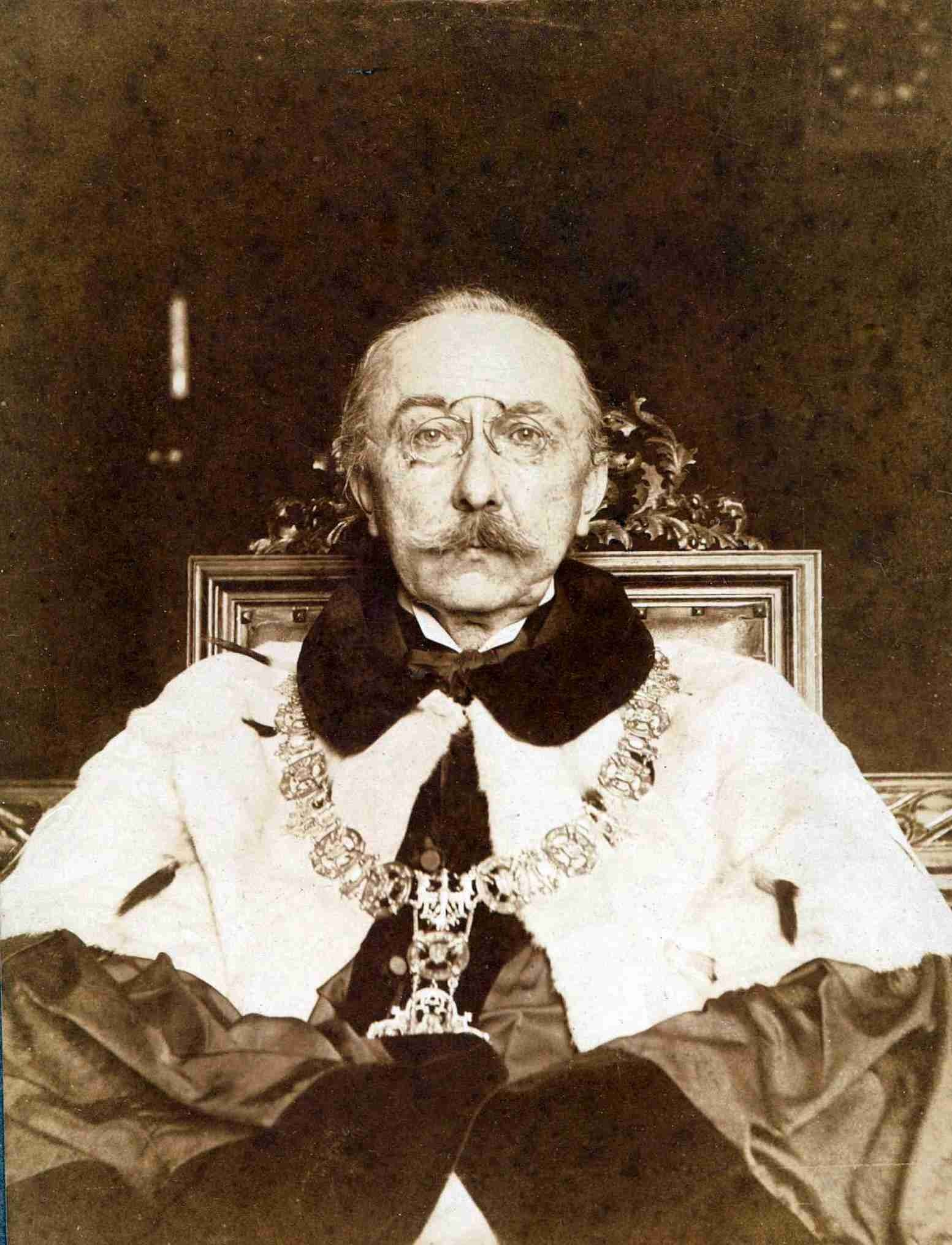
Witkowski

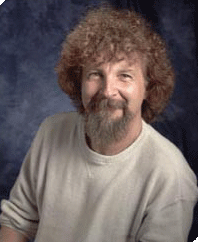
Zurek

== Chemistry ==
- Osman Achmatowicz
- Józef Boguski
- Kazimierz Boratyński
- Jan Czochralski, modern semiconductors
- Emil Czyrniański
- Tadeusz Estreicher, cryogenics pioneer
- Kazimierz Fajans, Polish-American physical chemist
- Kazimierz Funk, biochemist, the concept of vitamins
- Alvin Gajadhur, politician, statesman, chemical engineer, and educator
- Andrzej Górak
- Antoni Grabowski, chemical engineer
- Konstanty Hrynakowski
- Andrzej Jajszczyk
- Alina Kabata-Pendias
- Aharon Katzir, Israeli pioneer in electrochemistry of biopolymers
- Wiktor Kemula
- Włodzimierz Kołos
- Stanisław Kostanecki, organic chemist
- Marek Gatty-Kostyal
- Józef R. Lewandowski
- Ignacy Łukasiewicz, inventor of kerosene lamp
- Mieczysław Mąkosza
- Leon Marchlewski
- Bolesław Masłowski
- Krzysztof Matyjaszewski, Polish-American
- Mark Miodownik, British materials scientist and engineer
- Ignacy Mościcki
- Marceli Nencki
- Karol Olszewski
- Krzysztof Palczewski, biochemist
- Janusz Pawliszyn
- Piotr Piecuch, Polish-American theoretical chemist
- Sylwester Porowski
- Bronisław Radziszewski
- Tadeusz Reichstein, Polish-Swiss Nobel Prize winner
- Michał Sędziwój, Latinized as Sendivogius: alchemist, physician, discoverer of oxygen
- Zuzanna S. Siwy, Polish-American
- Maria Skłodowska Curie (Marie Curie), two-time Nobel Prize winner
- Edward Sucharda
- Jędrzej Śniadecki
- Wojciech Świętosławski, "father of thermochemistry"
- Bohdan Szyszkowski
- Włodzimierz Trzebiatowski
- Filip Neriusz Walter, pioneer of organic chemistry
- Zygmunt Wróblewski
- Józef Zawadzki, physical chemist
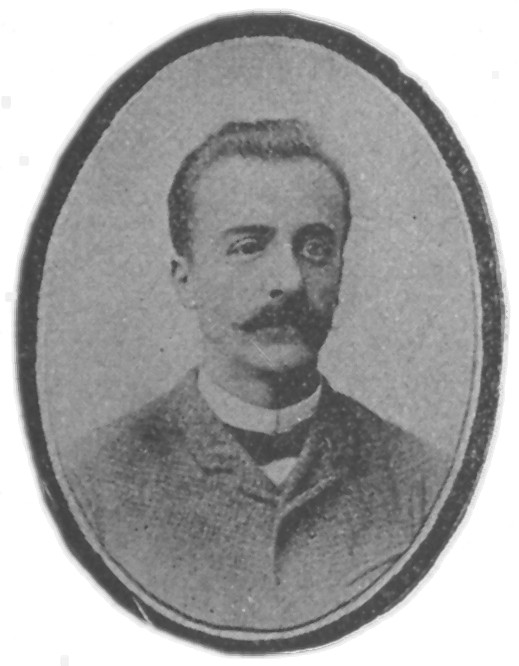
Boguski

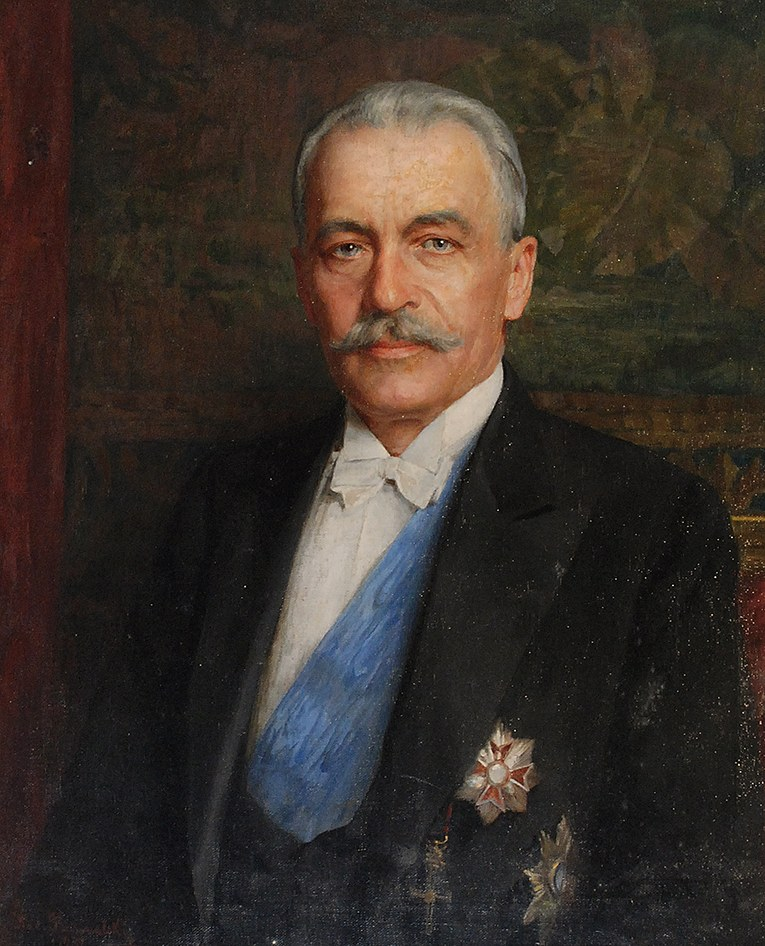
Mościcki

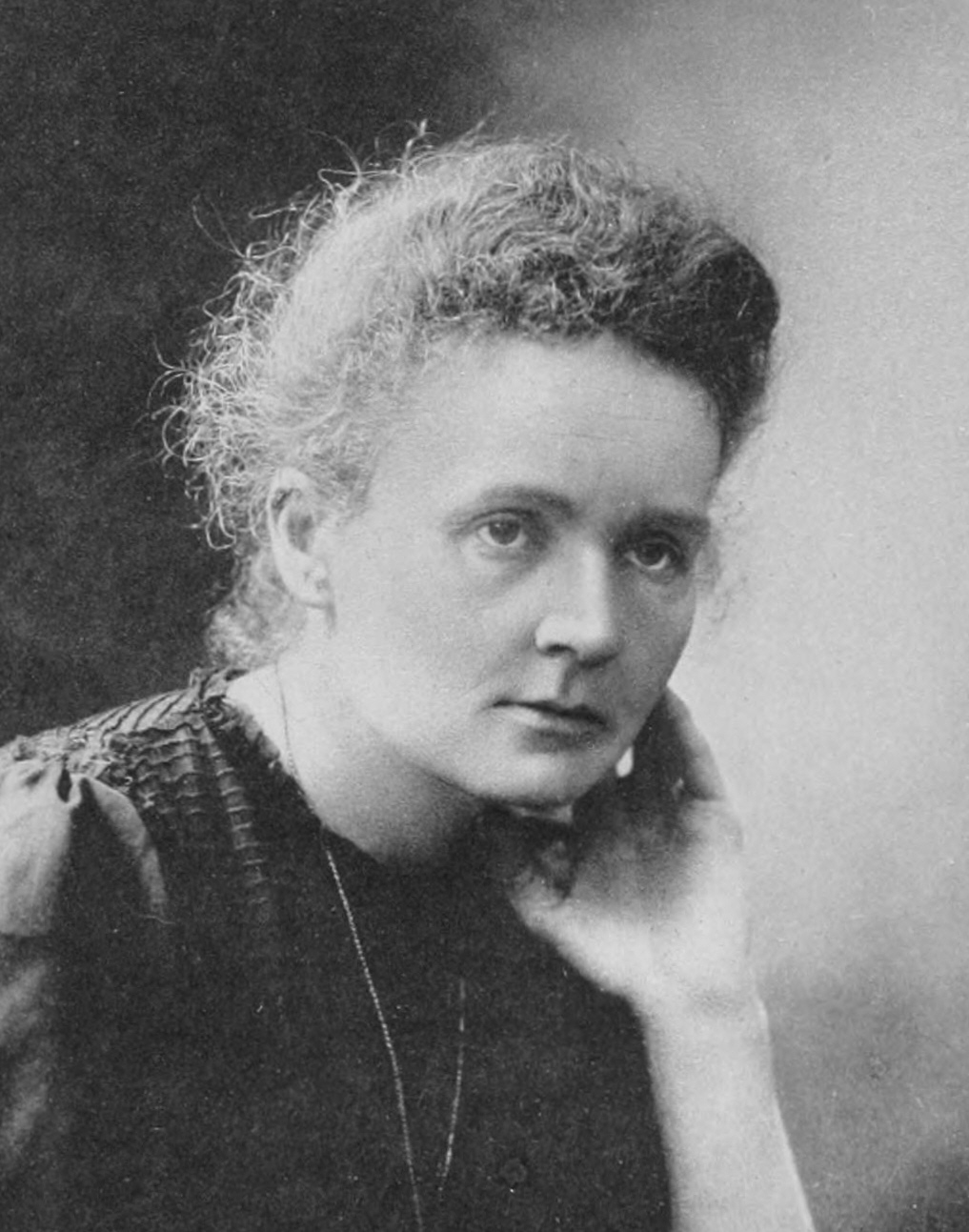
Skłodowska Curie

Czochralski

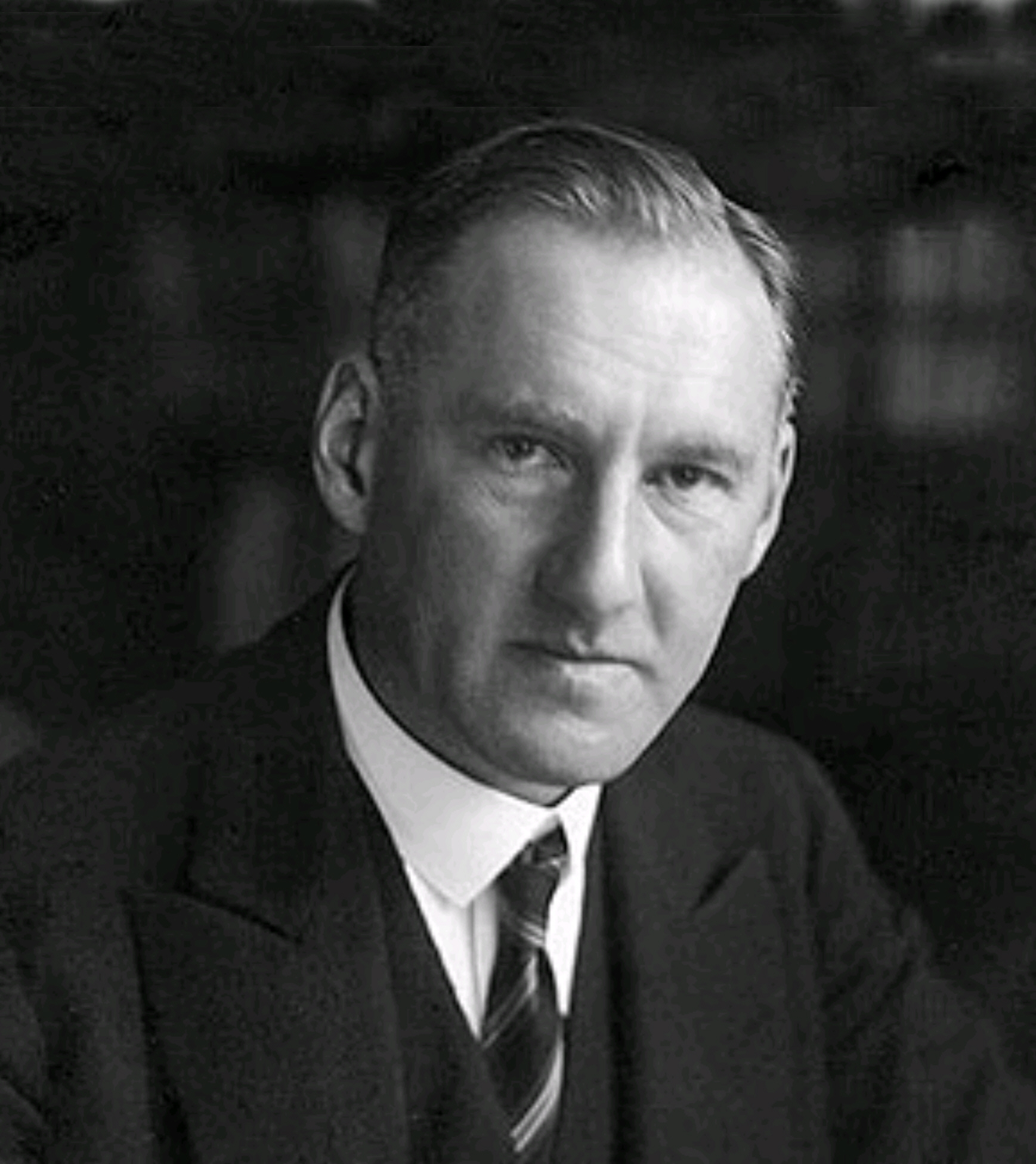
Fajans

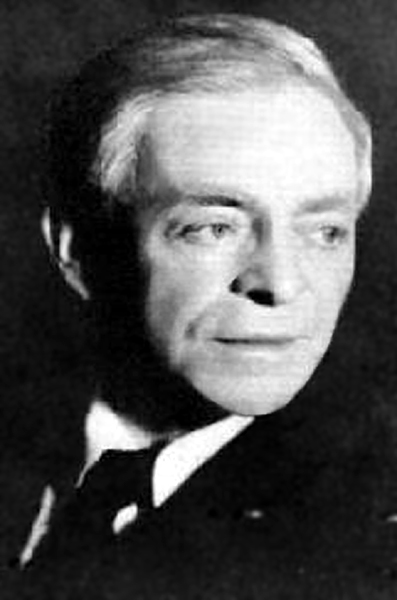
Funk

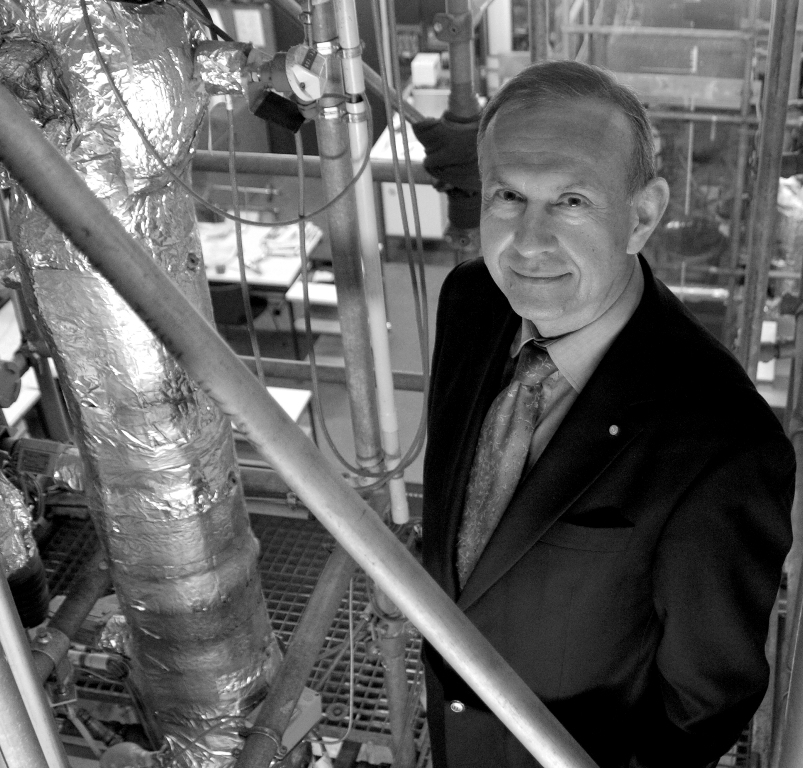
Górak

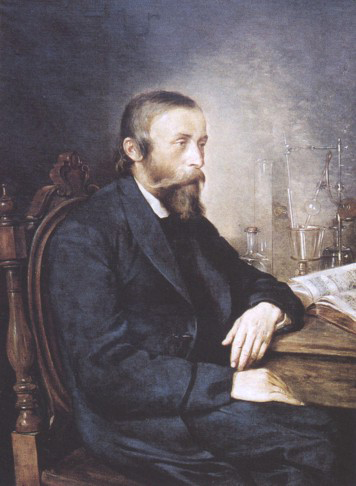
Łukasiewicz

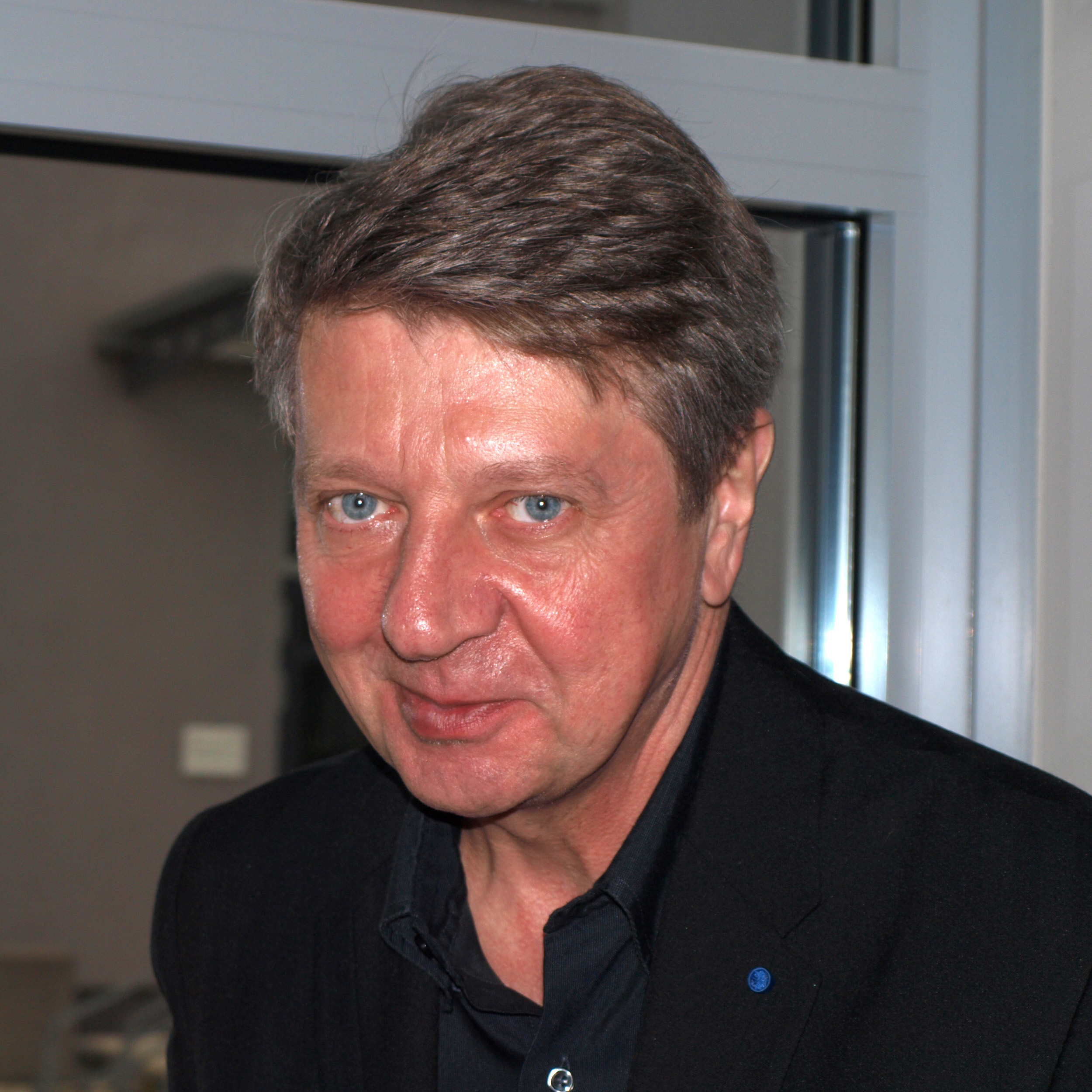
Matyjaszewski

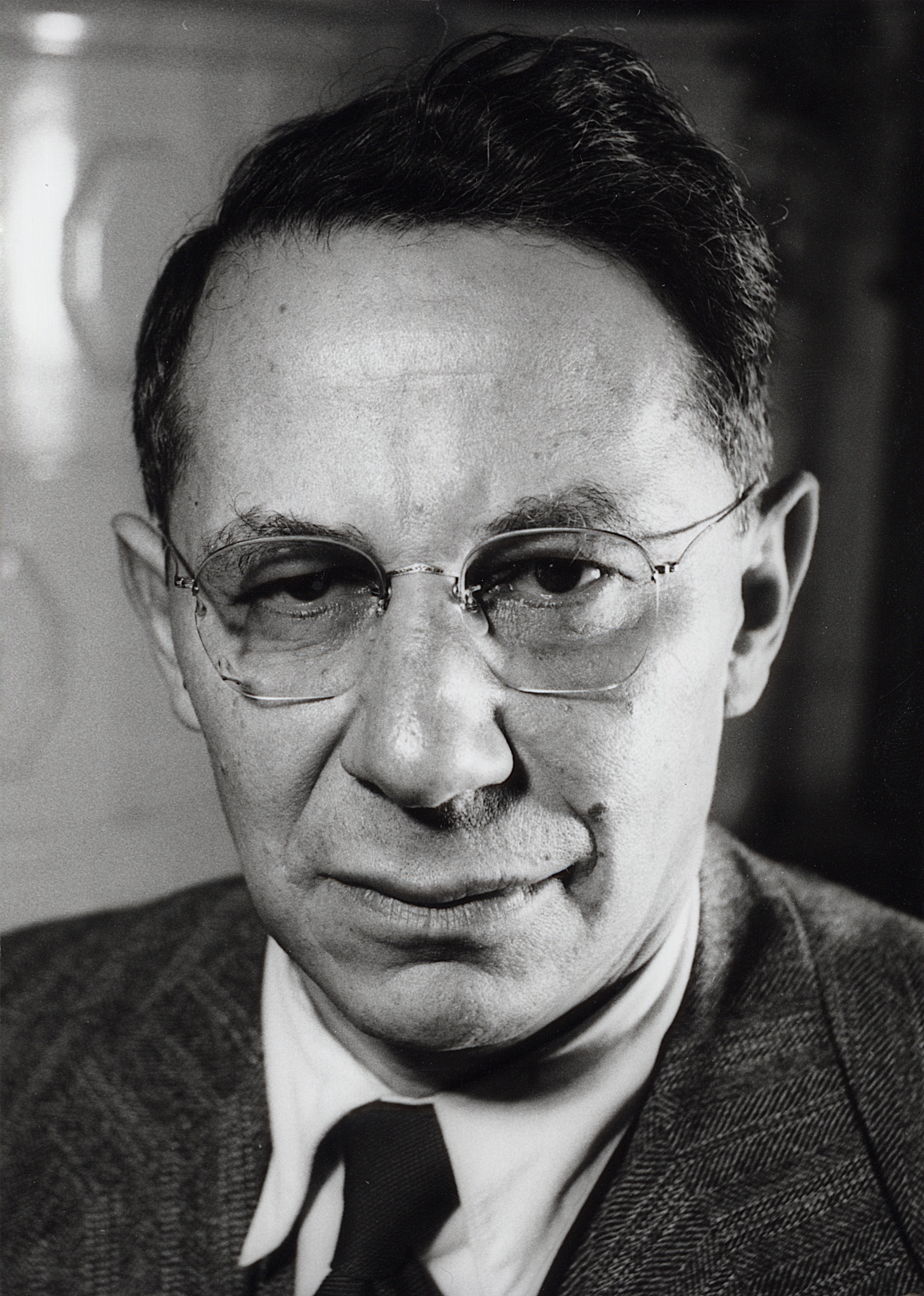
Reichstein

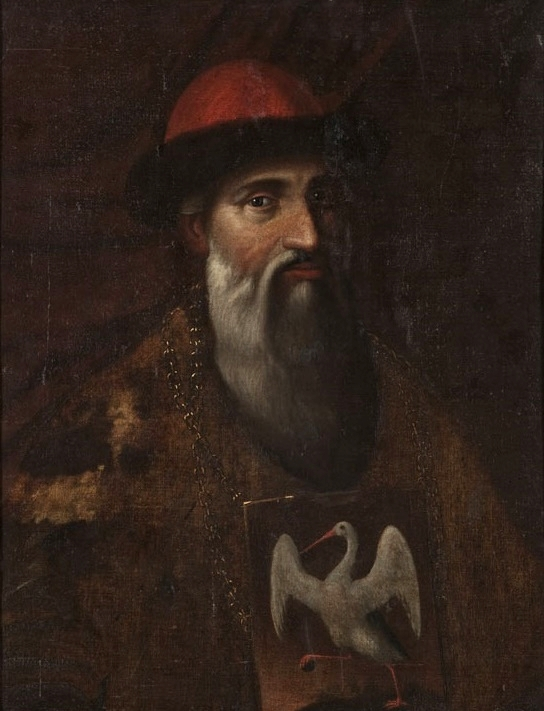
Sędziwój

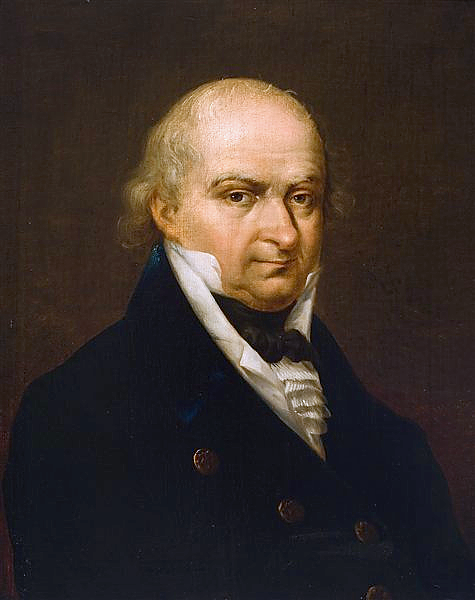
Śniadecki

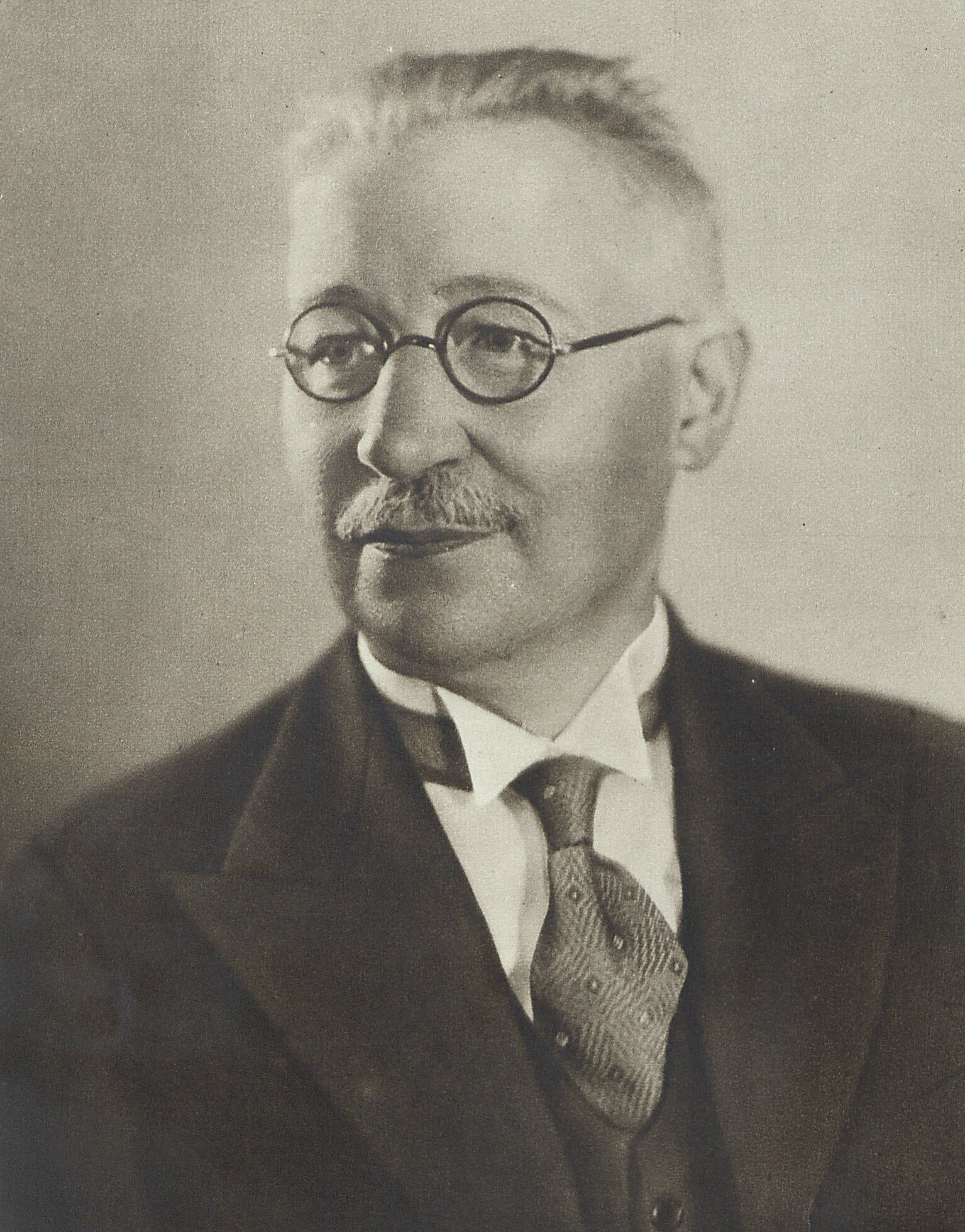
Świętosławski

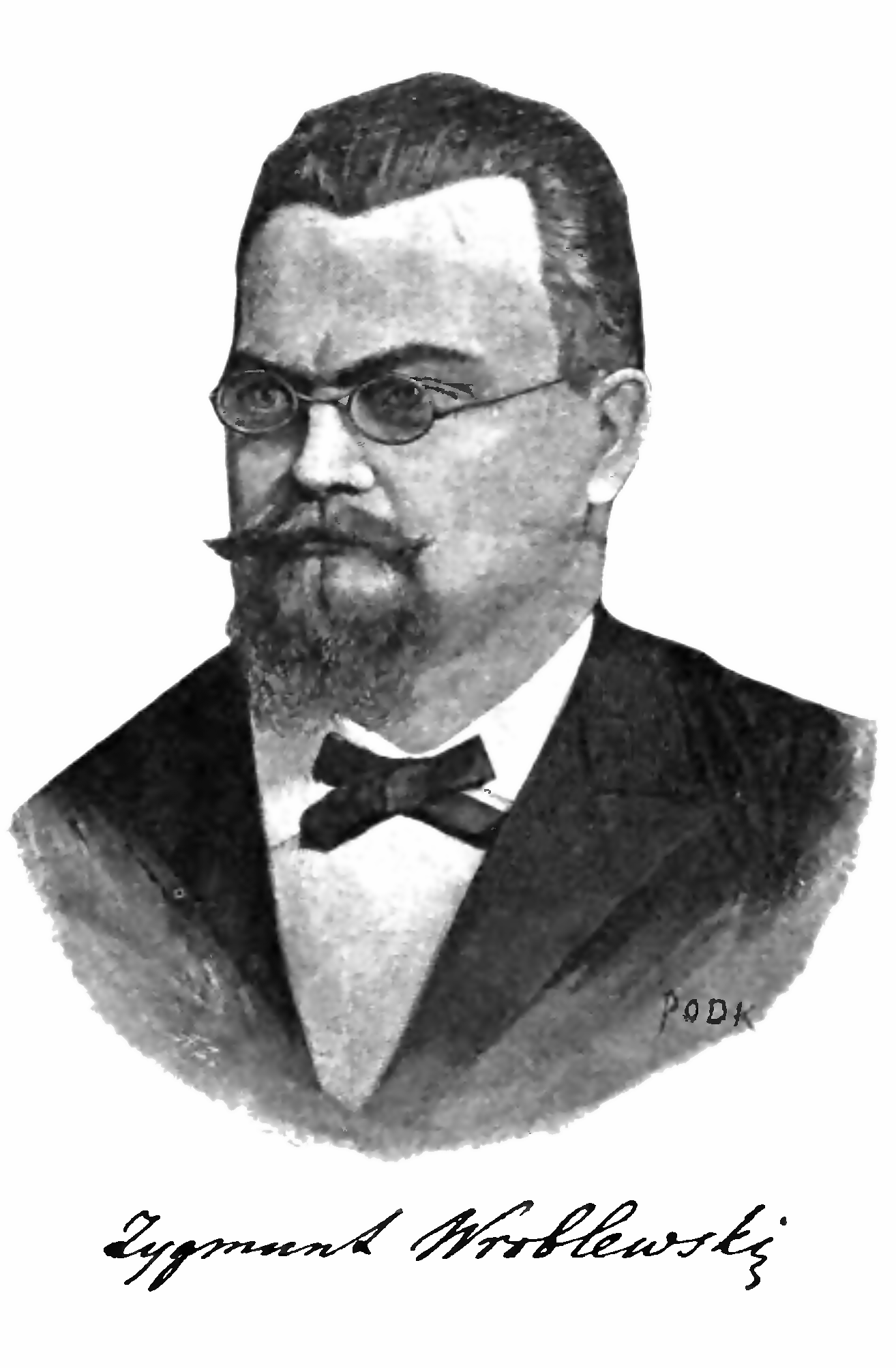
Wróblewski

== Biology, medicine ==
- Joseph Babinski, French-Polish neurologist, discoverer of the Babinski reflex
- Gabriela Balicka-Iwanowska, botanist
- Napoleon Baniewicz, Polish-Lithuanian nobleman and neurologist, discoverer of the Baniewicz reflex
- Edmund Biernacki, physician, discoverer of erythrocyte sedimentation rate
- Czesław Bieżanko, entomologist
- Jan Biziel, physician, social activist
- Tytus Chałubiński, physician
- Napoleon Cybulski, neurophysiologist, discoverer of adrenaline
- Maria Antonina Czaplicka, anthropologist
- Jan Czekanowski, anthropologist
- Kazimierz Dąbrowski, psychiatrist, creator of the theory of positive disintegration
- Wiktor Dega, surgeon and orthopedist
- August Dehnel, biologist
- Józef Dietl, physician
- Hermann Dietz, physician, senator of the Republic of Poland, social activist
- Jan Dzierżon, zoologist, apiarist
- Stefan Falimierz, physician, herbalist
- Sidney Farber, American pediatric pathologist and cancer biologist, founder of the Dana–Farber Cancer Institute
- Edward Flatau, neurologist
- Ludwik Fleck, Polish-Israeli microbiologist, philosopher of science
- Eva Frommer, child psychiatrist and anthroposophist
- Kazimierz Funk, biochemist, coined the term vitamin
- Marian Gieszczykiewicz, physician and bacteriologist
- Emil Godlewski, embryologist
- Samuel Goldflam, neurologist
- Adam Gruca, surgeon and orthopaedist
- Ryszard Gryglewski, pharmacologist, physician
- Tomasz Guzik (born 1974), physician
- Ludwik Hirszfeld, microbiologist and serologist
- Janina Hurynowicz, neurophysiologist
- Feliks Paweł Jarocki, zoologist and entomologist
- Stefania Jabłońska, dermatologist
- Walery Jaworski, physician
- Konstanty Jelski, ornithologist
- Zbigniew Kabata, biologist
- Ewa Kamler (born 1937), biologist and ichthyologist
- Zofia Kielan-Jaworowska, paleobiologist
- Aleksander Koj, physician, scientist
- Ryszard Kole, Polish-American pharmacologist
- Jerzy Konorski, neurophysiologist
- Stefan Kopeć, biologist
- Irena Koprowska, pathologist
- Hilary Koprowski, polio vaccine
- Tadeusz Krwawicz, medical pioneer
- Elwira Lisowska (born 1930), biochemist
- Abraham Low, American neuropsychiatrist
- Margaret Lowenfeld, British paediatrician and pioneer of Sandplay Therapy
- Liliana Lubińska, neuroscientist
- Zofia Majewska, neurologist and professor
- Karol Marcinkowski, physician
- Eugène Minkowski, psychiatrist influenced by Bergson and phenomenology
- Ludwik Młokosiewicz, botanist
- Maksymilian Nowicki, biologist
- Ferdynand Antoni Ossendowski, biologist
- Janina Oszast, biologist, palaeobotanist and resistance fighter
- Marek Pienkowski (born 1945), Polish-American immunologist
- Piotr Ponikowski, cardiologist
- Moshe Prywes (1914–1998), Israeli physician and educator; first President of Ben-Gurion University of the Negev
- Tadeusz Reichstein (1897–1996), Polish-Swiss physiologist; 1950 Nobel Laureate in Physiology or Medicine
- Zbigniew Religa, cardiologist
- Józef Rostafiński, biologist
- Albert Sabin, polio vaccine; President of the Weizmann Institute of Science
- Andrzej Wiktor Schally (1926–2024), Polish-American Nobel-laureate endocrinologist
- Hanna Segal, British leading Kleinian psychoanalyst
- Michael Sela (1924–2022), Israeli immunologist; President of the Weizmann Institute of Science
- Henryk Skarżyński, otolaryngologist, audiologist, phoniatrist
- Michalina Stefanowska, neurophysiologist
- Eduard Adolf Strasburger (born in Poland, of German descent), botanist
- Andrzej Szczeklik, immunologist
- Jan Sztolcman, ornithologist
- Wacław Szybalski, Polish-American physician
- Władysław Taczanowski, zoologist
- Andrzej K. Tarkowski, embryologist
- Zbylut Twardowski, Polish-American physician
- Jerzy Vetulani, neuroscientist, pharmacologist and biochemist
- Emil Warmiński, physician, social and national activist
- Józef Warszewicz, botanist and biologist
- Rudolf Weigl, typhus vaccine
- Wanda Wesołowska, zoologist
- Helena Rosa Wright, English physician influential in family planning
- Marie Elizabeth Zakrzewska, Polish-American physician
- Jozef J. Zwislocki, neuroscientist
- Helena Żygulska-Mach, physician and ophthalmologist
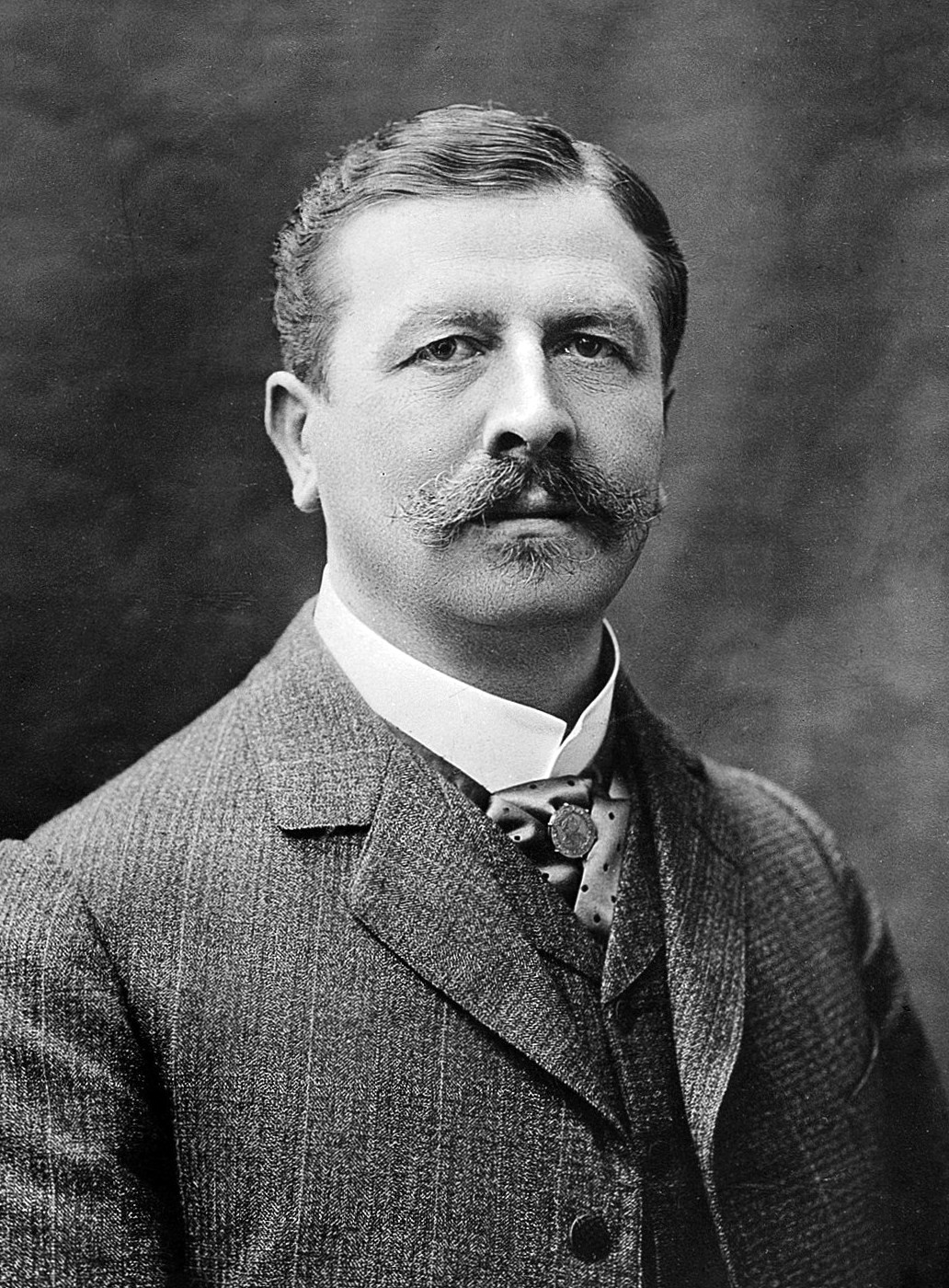
Babinski

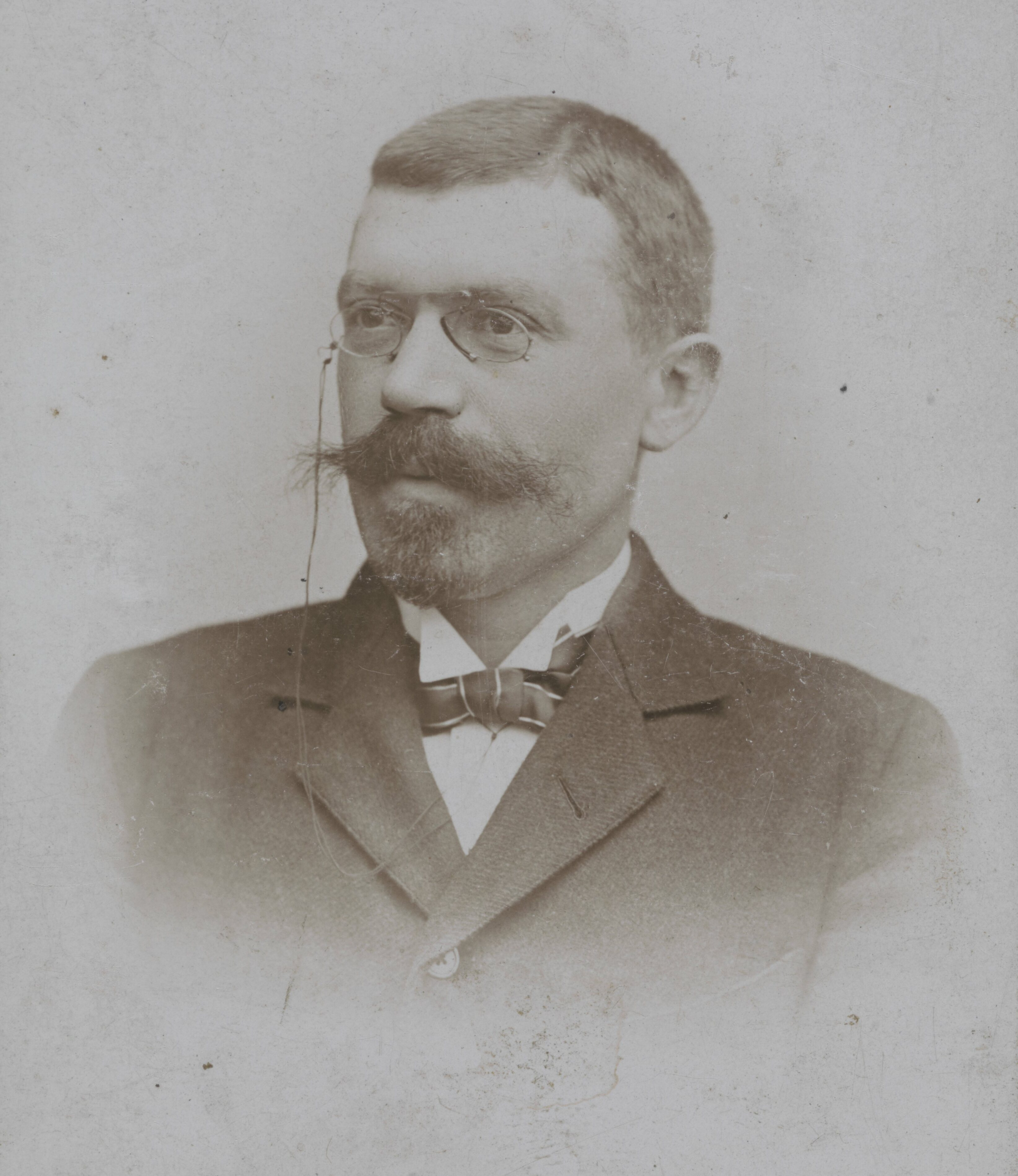
Biernacki

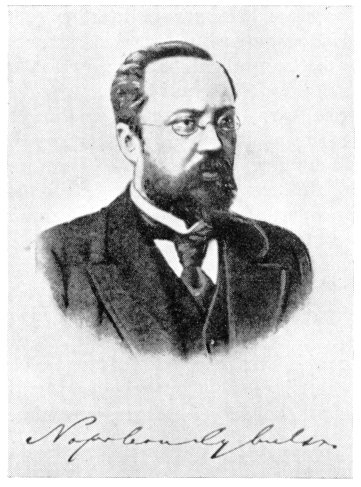
Cybulski

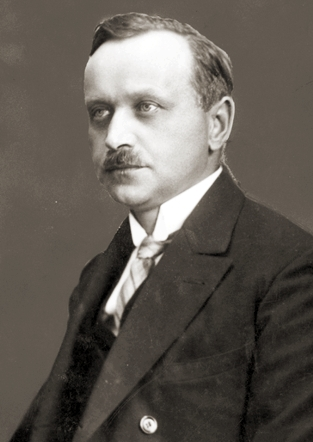
Czekanowski

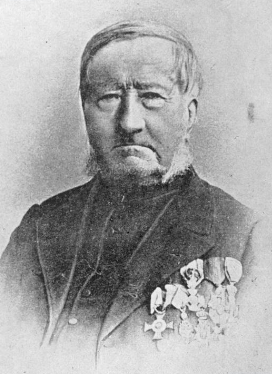
Dzierżoń

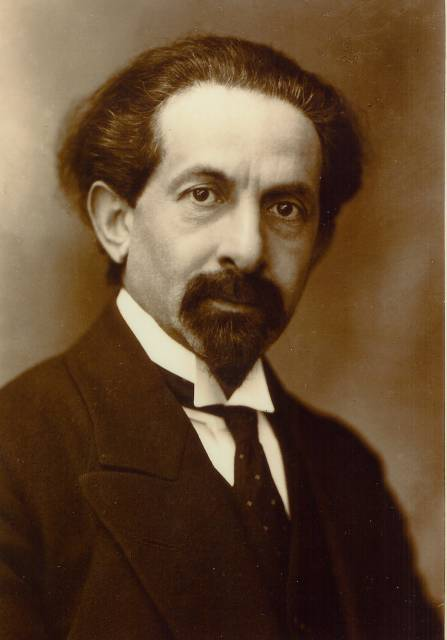
Flatau

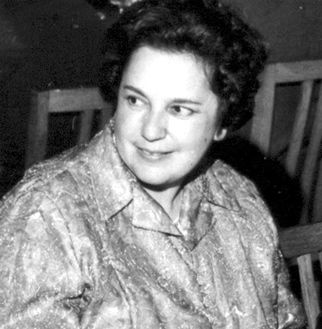
Frommer

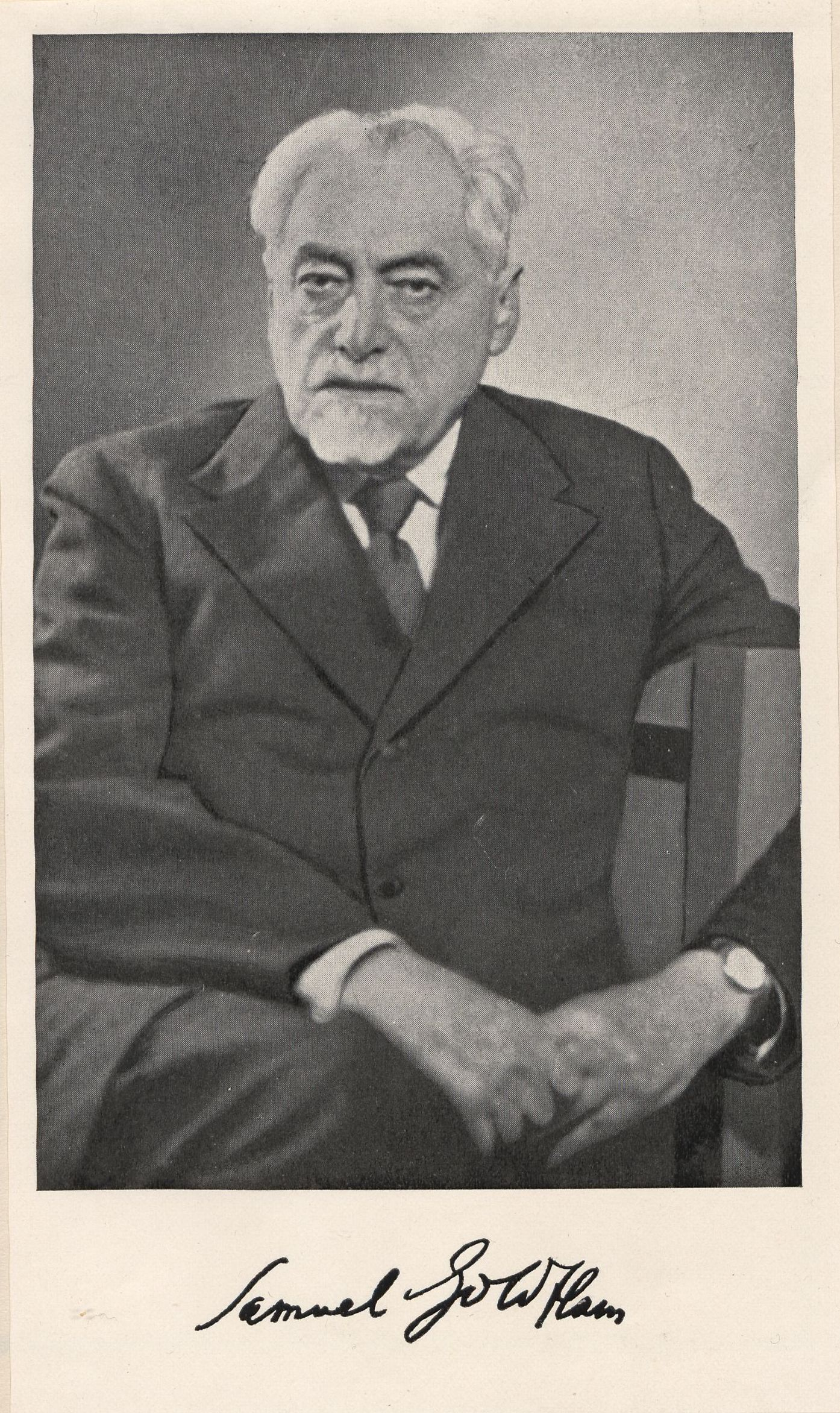
Goldflam

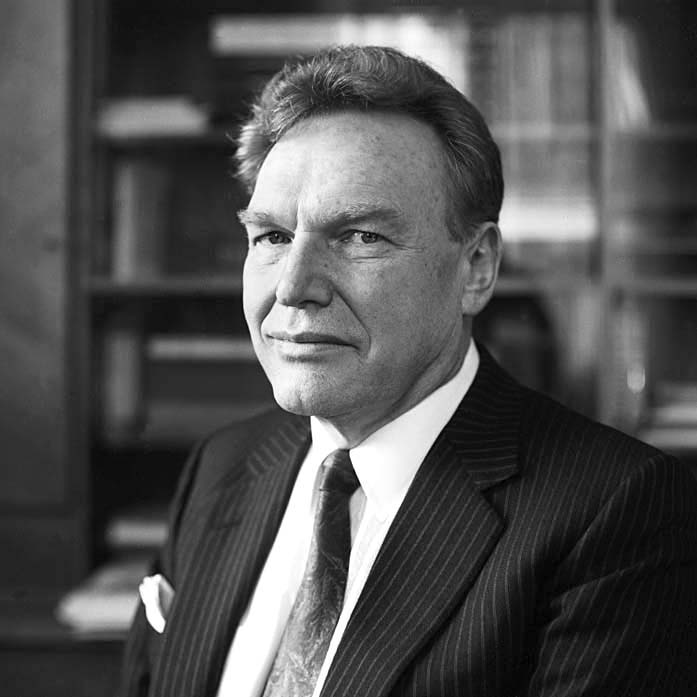
Gryglewski

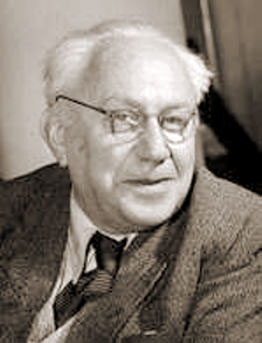
Hirszfeld

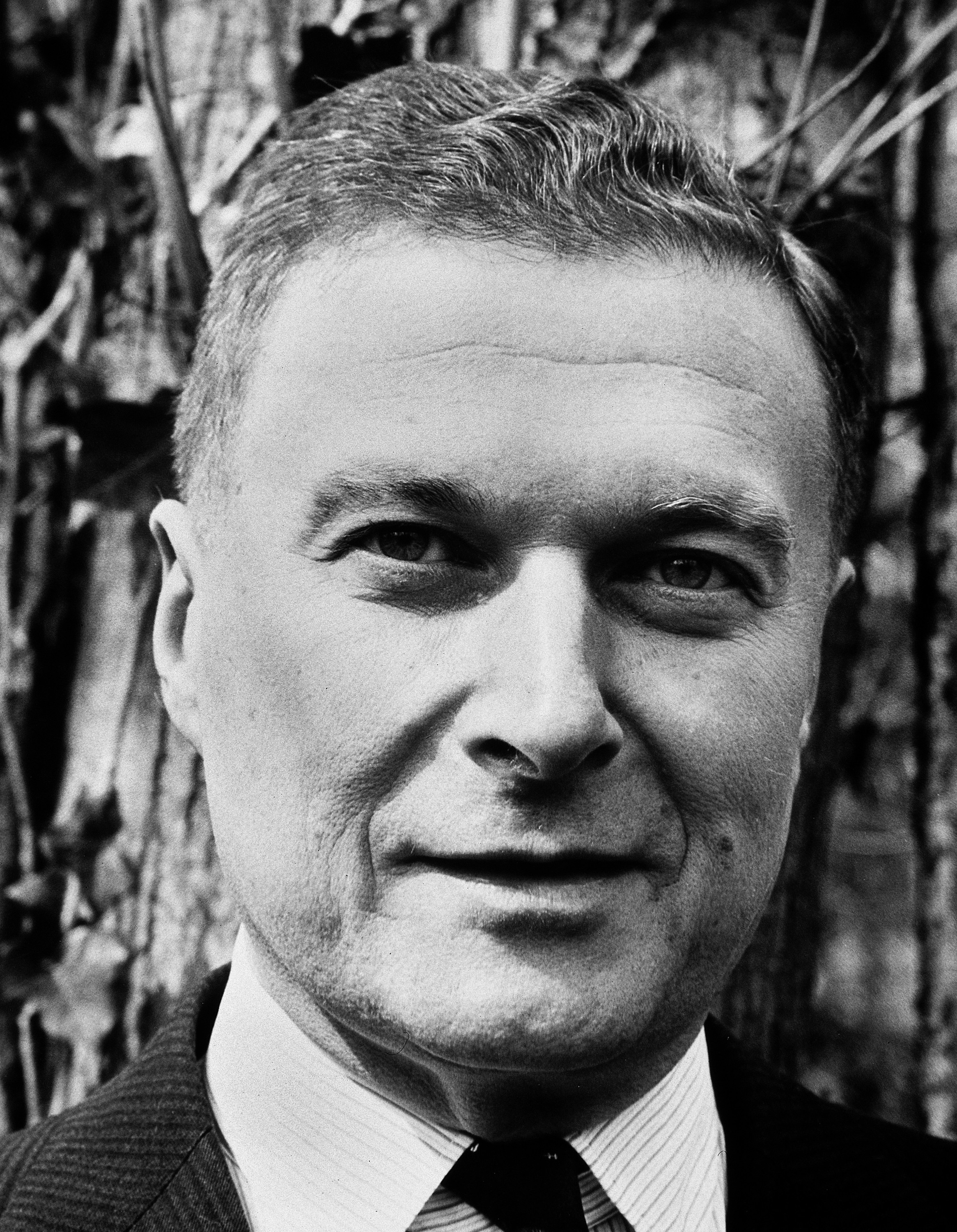
Koprowski

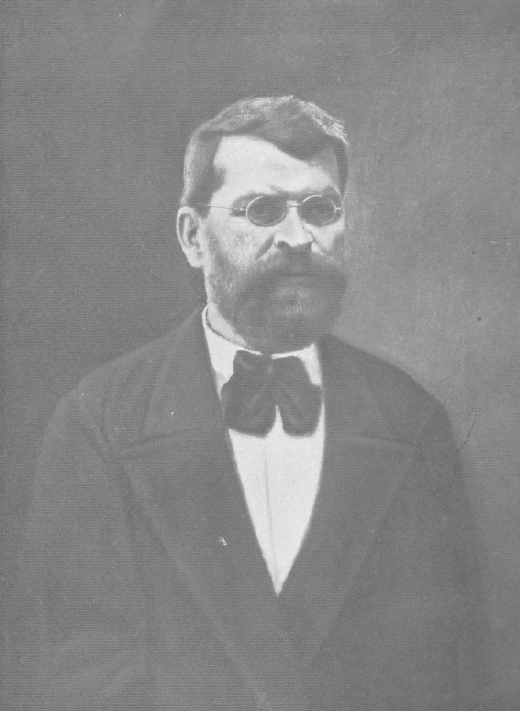
Nowicki

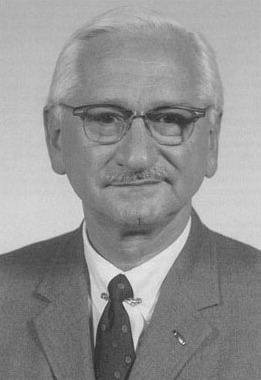
Sabin

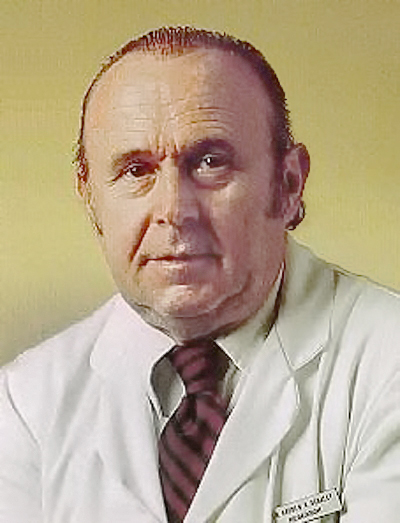
Schally

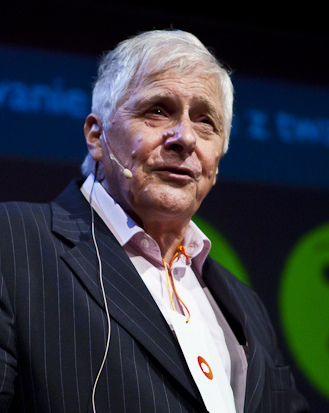
Vetulani

Weigl

== Astronomy ==
- Franciszek Armiński
- Tadeusz Banachiewicz
- Jan Brożek
- Albert Brudzewski
- Nicolaus Copernicus, Polish astronomer, the son of a Polish father and a mother who was of mixed German-Polish descent; he is also often considered a German by Germans
- Wojciech Dziembowski
- Władysław Dziewulski
- Michał Falkener
- Jan Gadomski
- Elisabeth Hevelius, astronomer and wife of Johannes Hevelius
- Johannes Hevelius, mayor of Gdańsk; often also considered a German
- Felicjan Kępiński
- Marian Albertovich Kowalski
- Kazimierz Kordylewski
- Wojciech Krzemiński
- Jan Latosz
- Stanisław Lubieniecki
- Bohdan Paczyński
- Marcin Poczobutt-Odlanicki
- Alexius Sylvius Polonus
- Adam Prażmowski
- Antoni Przybylski
- Agata Różańska
- Konrad Rudnicki
- Jan Mikołaj Smogulecki
- Jan Śniadecki
- Andrzej Udalski
- Wiesław Wiśniewski
- Aleksander Wolszczan, first discovery of extrasolar planets
- Thomas Zebrowski
- Anna N. Żytkow
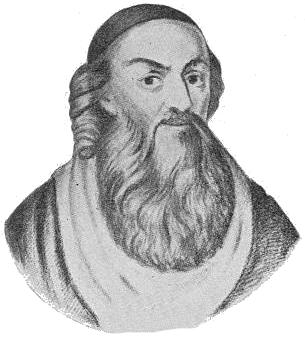
Brudzewski

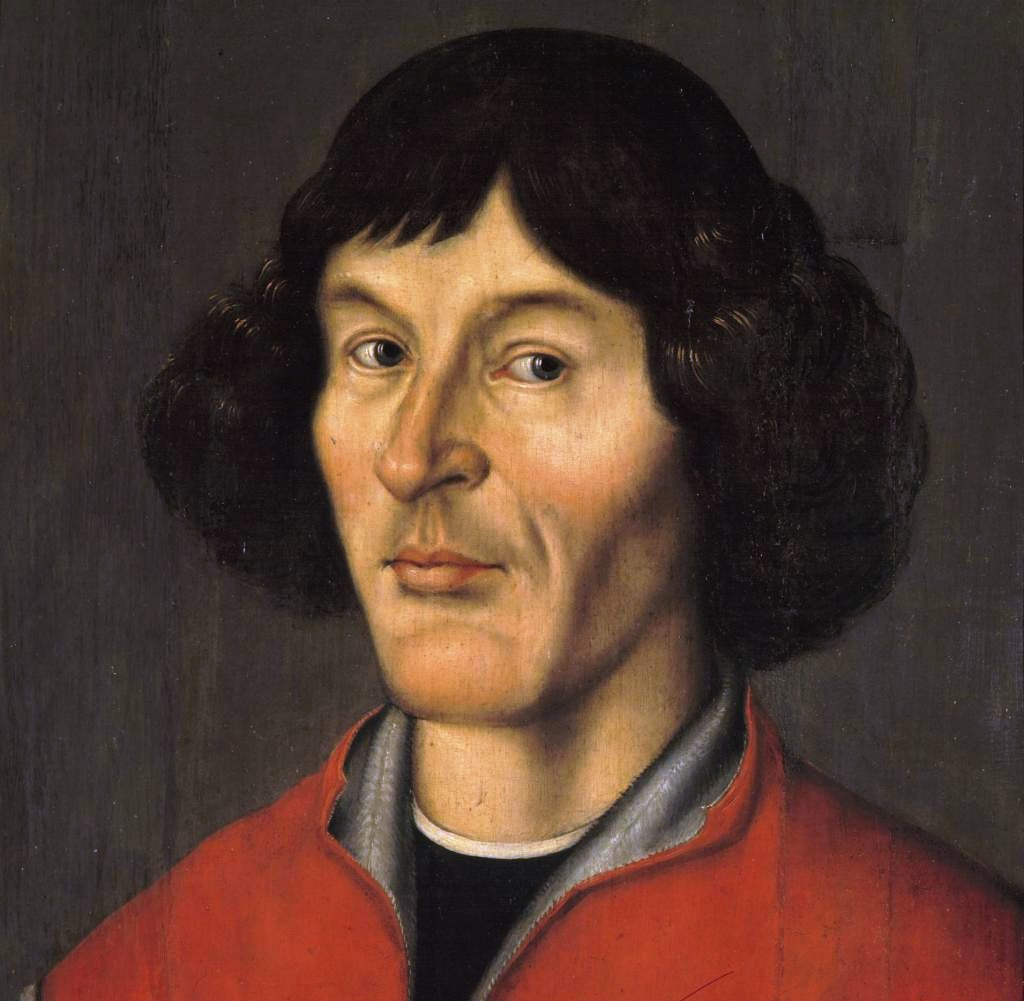
Copernicus

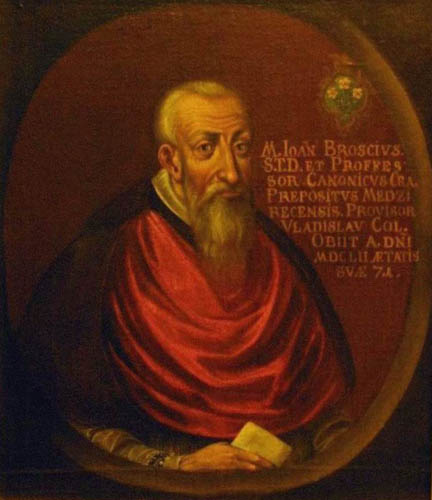
Brożek

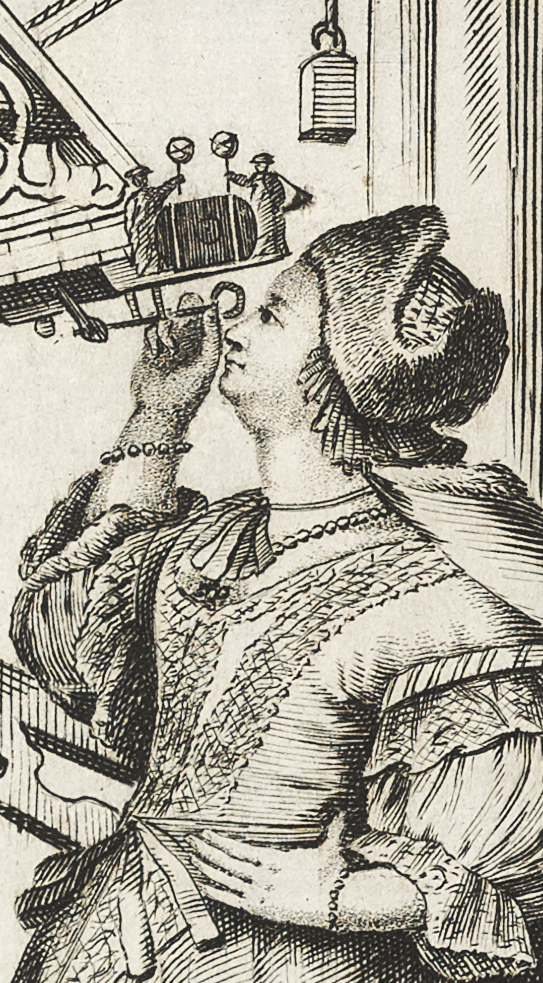
Elisabeth Hevelius

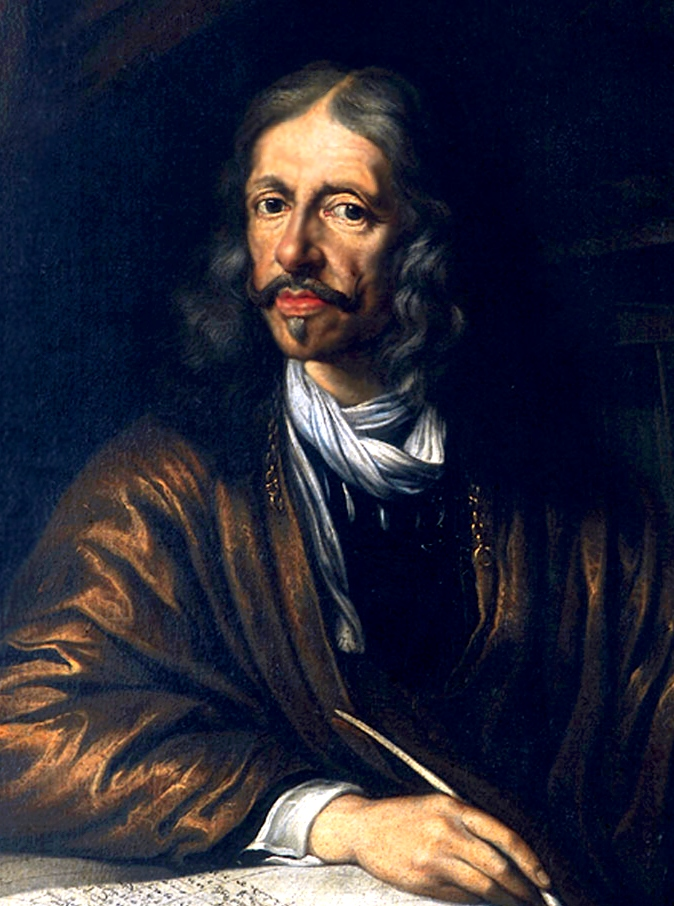
Johannes Hevelius

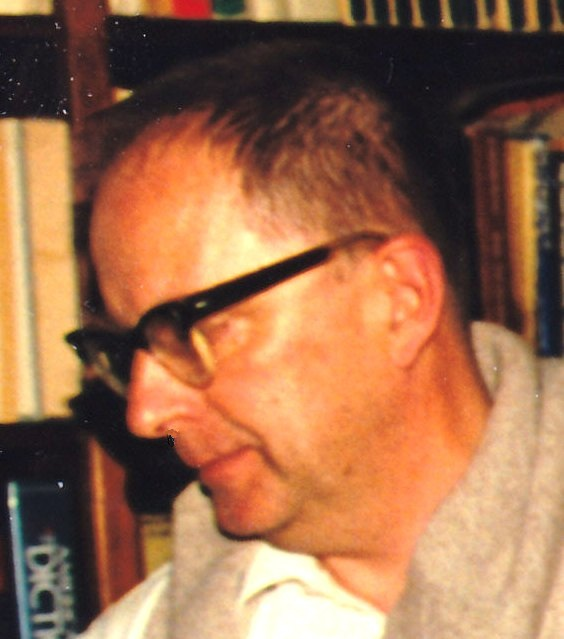
Paczyński

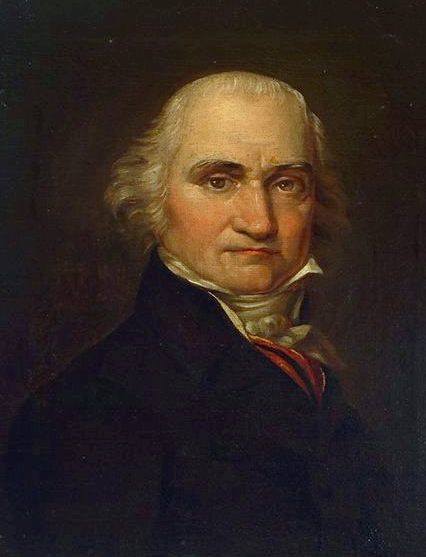
Jan Śniadecki

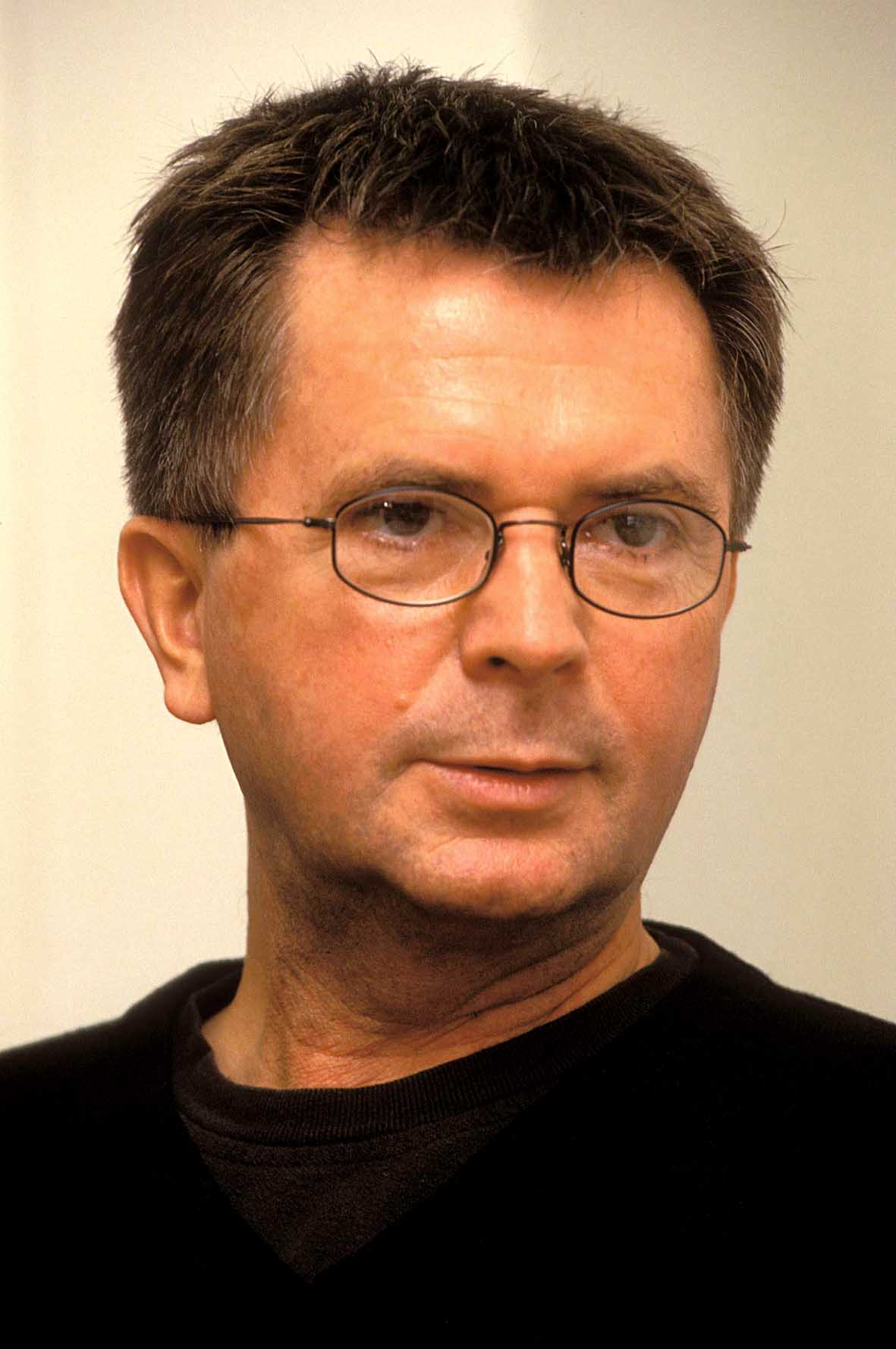
Wolszczan

== Mathematics ==
- Nachman Aronszajn, Polish-American
- Michel Balinski, American-French
- Stefan Banach
- Tadeusz Banachiewicz
- Kazimierz Bartel
- Andrzej Białynicki-Birula
- Karol Borsuk
- Jacob Bronowski, Polish-British
- Jan Brożek
- Andrzej Ehrenfeucht, Polish-American
- Meier Eidelheit
- Samuel Eilenberg, Polish-American
- Andrzej Grzegorczyk
- Witold Hurewicz
- Henryk Iwaniec
- Tadeusz Iwaniec, Polish-American
- Zygmunt Janiszewski
- Stanisław Jaśkowski, logician
- Jan Jaworowski, Polish-American
- Mark Kac, Polish-American
- Stefan Kaczmarz
- Marek Karpinski, computer scientist
- Dawid Kielak
- Bronisław Knaster
- Sławomir Kołodziej
- Robert Kowalski, American-British logician
- Zdzisław Krygowski
- Krystyna Kuperberg, Polish-American
- Włodzimierz Kuperberg
- Kazimierz Kuratowski
- Izabella Łaba, Polish-Canadian
- Franciszek Leja
- Stanisław Leśniewski
- Adolf Lindenbaum
- Stanisław Łojasiewicz
- Antoni Łomnicki
- Jerzy Łoś
- Jan Łukasiewicz, logician, inventor of the parenthesis-free Polish Notation
- Benoit Mandelbrot, Polish-born French-American
- Edward Marczewski
- Józef Marcinkiewicz
- Stanisław Mazur
- Stefan Mazurkiewicz
- Jan Mikusinski
- Michał Misiurewicz
- Andrzej Mostowski
- Jan Mycielski, Polish-American
- Jerzy Spława-Neyman
- Otton M. Nikodym
- Wiesława Nizioł
- Andrew Odlyzko, Polish-American
- Władysław Orlicz
- Aleksander Pełczyński
- Józef H. Przytycki
- Maksym Radziwill, Polish-Canadian
- Helena Rasiowa
- Marian Rejewski, mathematician-cryptologist who broke the German Enigma cipher
- Jerzy Różycki, Enigma-breaker
- Stanisław Ruziewicz
- Czesław Ryll-Nardzewski
- Stanisław Saks
- Wojciech Samotij
- Juliusz Schauder
- Wacław Sierpiński
- Roman Sikorski
- Julian Sochocki, Polish-Russian
- Hugo Steinhaus
- Włodzimierz Stożek
- Wanda Szmielew, logician
- Władysław Ślebodziński
- Ivan Śleszyński, Polish-Russian
- Jan Śniadecki
- Alfred Tarski, Polish-American
- Adam Henryk Toruńczyk
- Stanisław Ulam, co-designer (with Edward Teller) of the hydrogen bomb
- Kazimierz Urbanik
- Arnold Walfisz
- Tadeusz Ważewski
- Mariusz Wodzicki
- Józef Hoene-Wroński
- Kazimierz Zarankiewicz
- Stanisław Zaremba
- Henryk Zygalski, Enigma-breaker
- Antoni Zygmund, Polish-American
- Kazimierz Żorawski
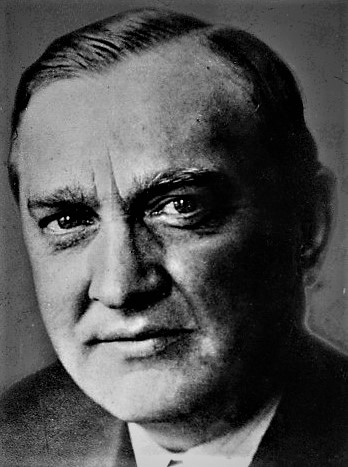
Banach

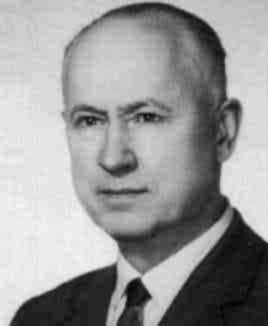
Borsuk

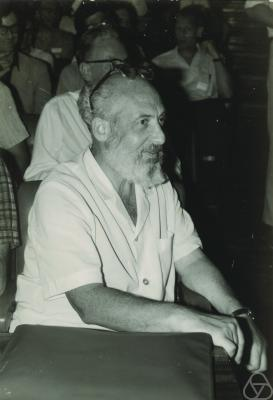
Eilenberg

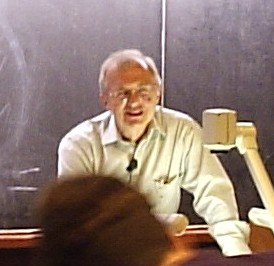
Iwaniec

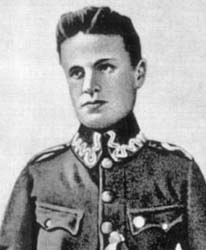
Janiszewski

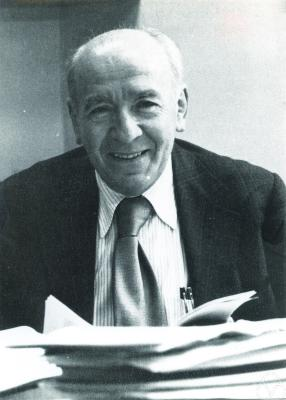
Kac

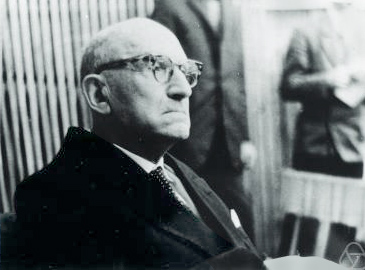
Knaster

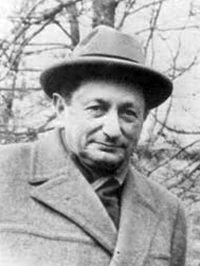
Kuratowski

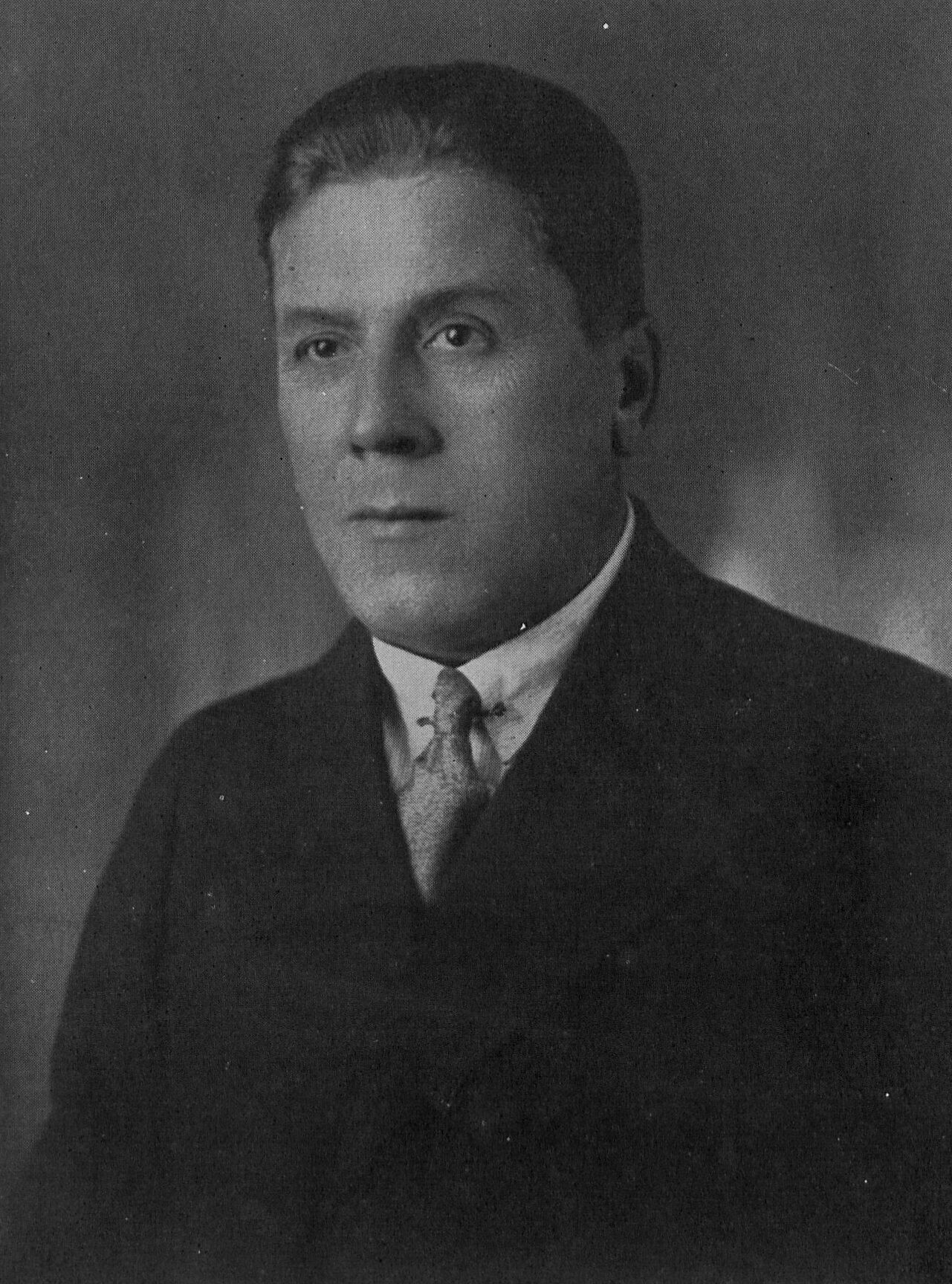
Leśniewski

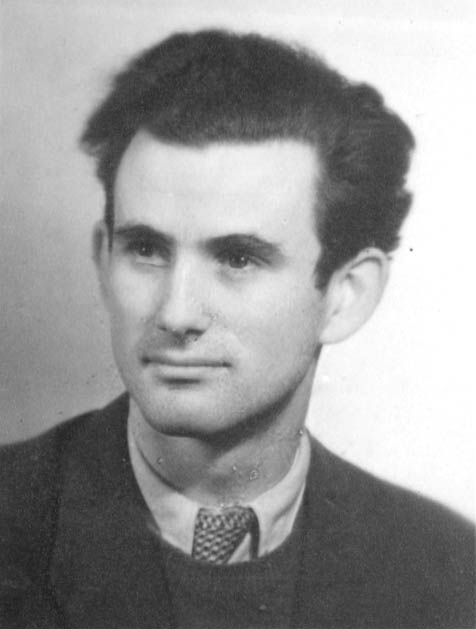
Łoś

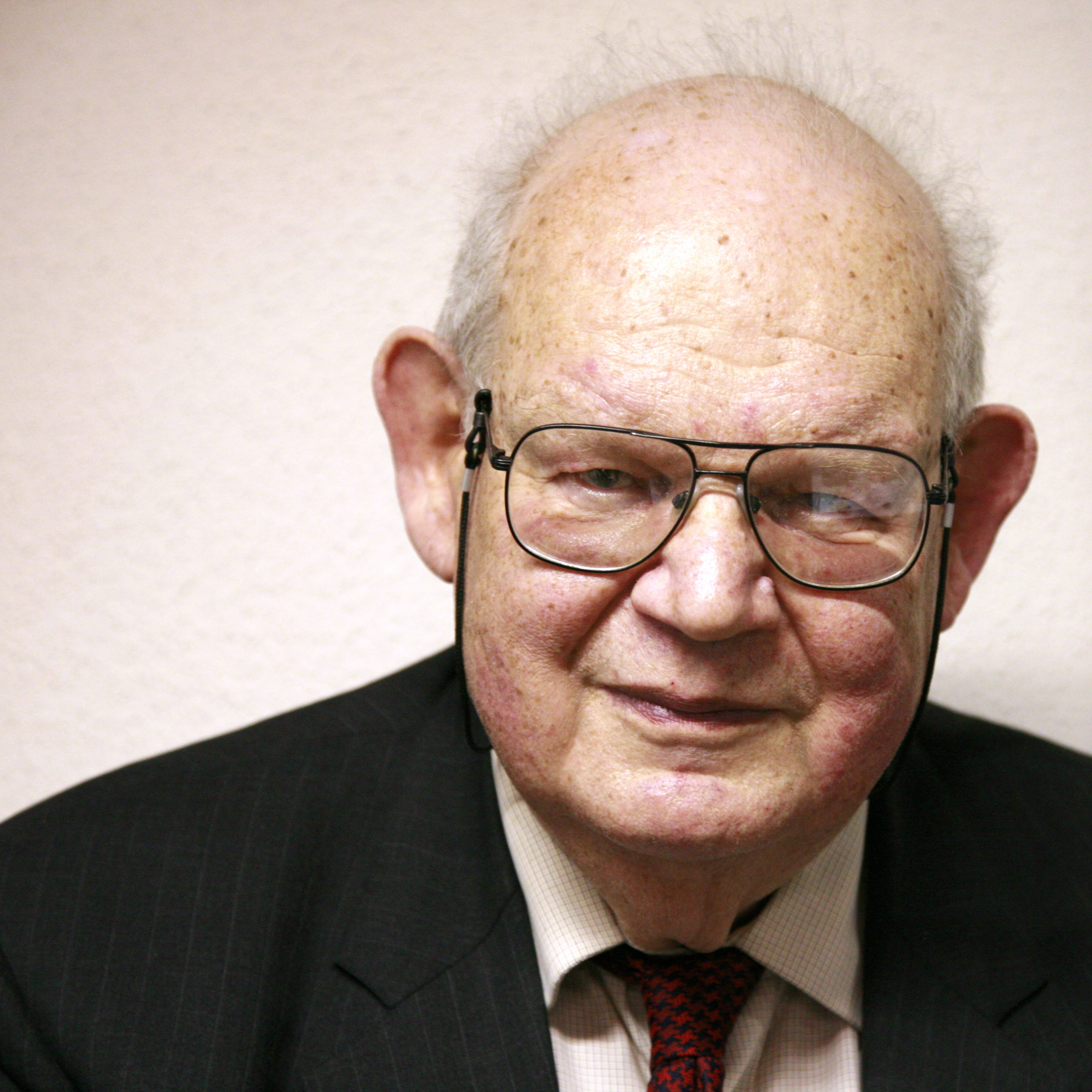
Mandelbrot

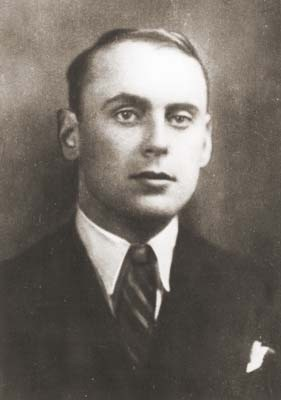
Marcinkiewicz

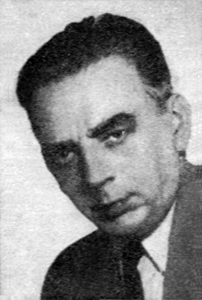
Mazur

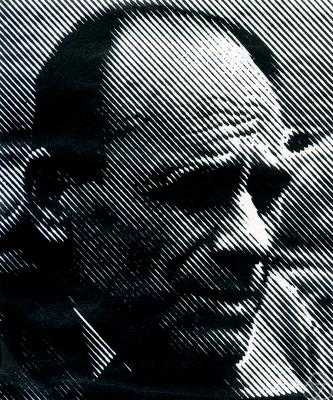
Mostowski

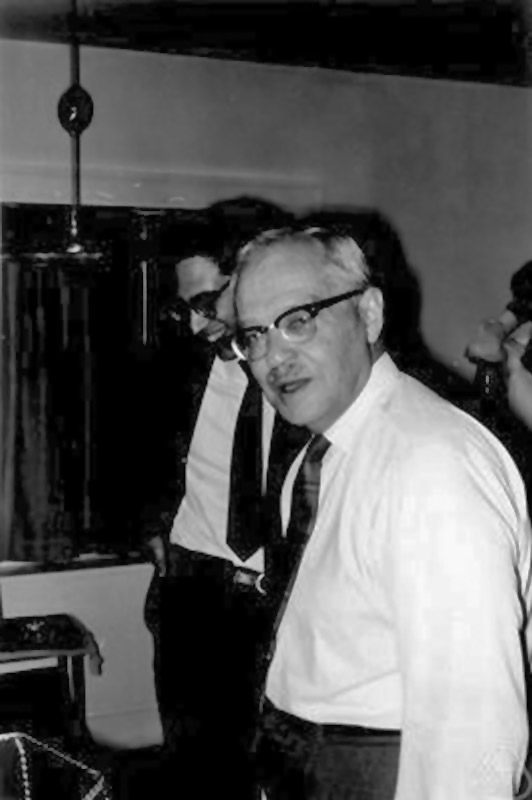
Neyman

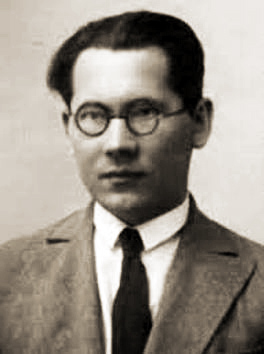
Orlicz

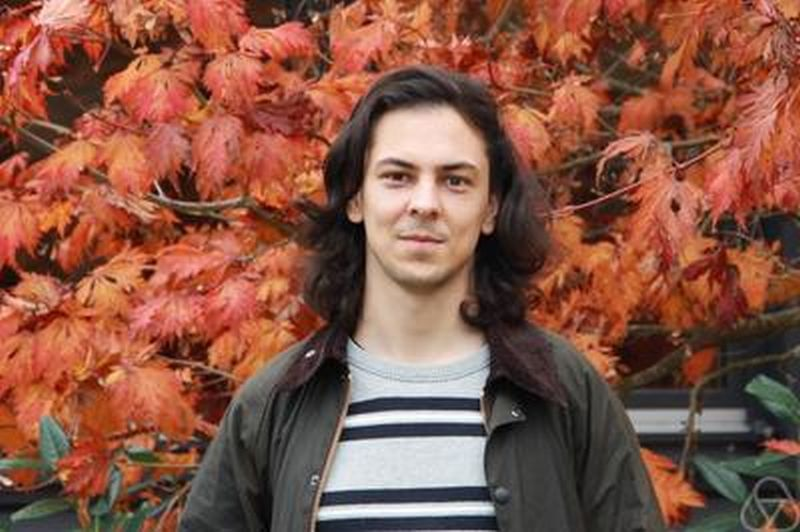
Radziwiłł

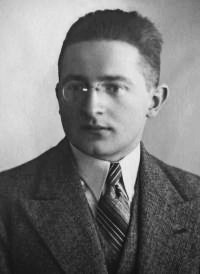
Rejewski

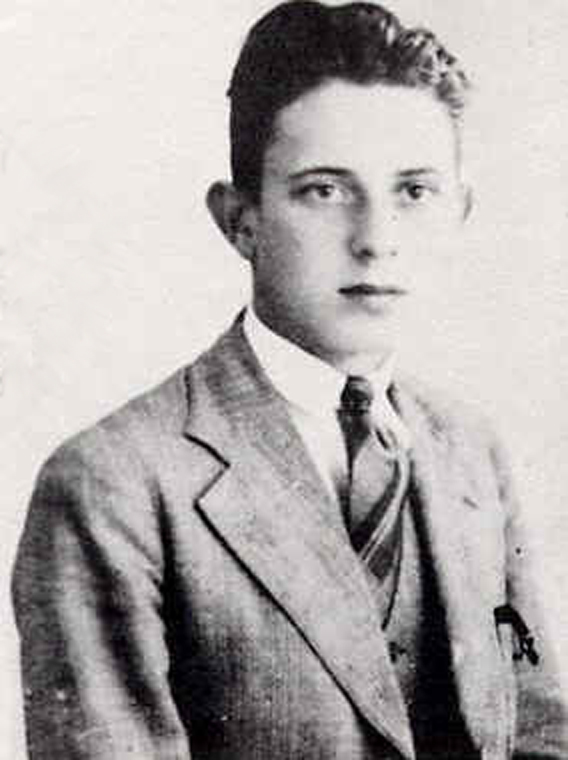
Różycki

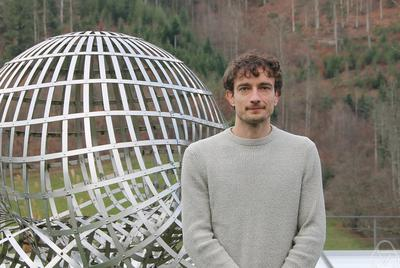
Samotij

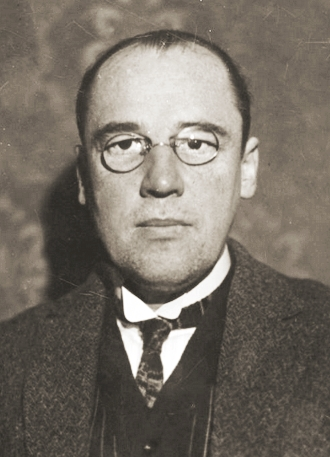
Sierpiński

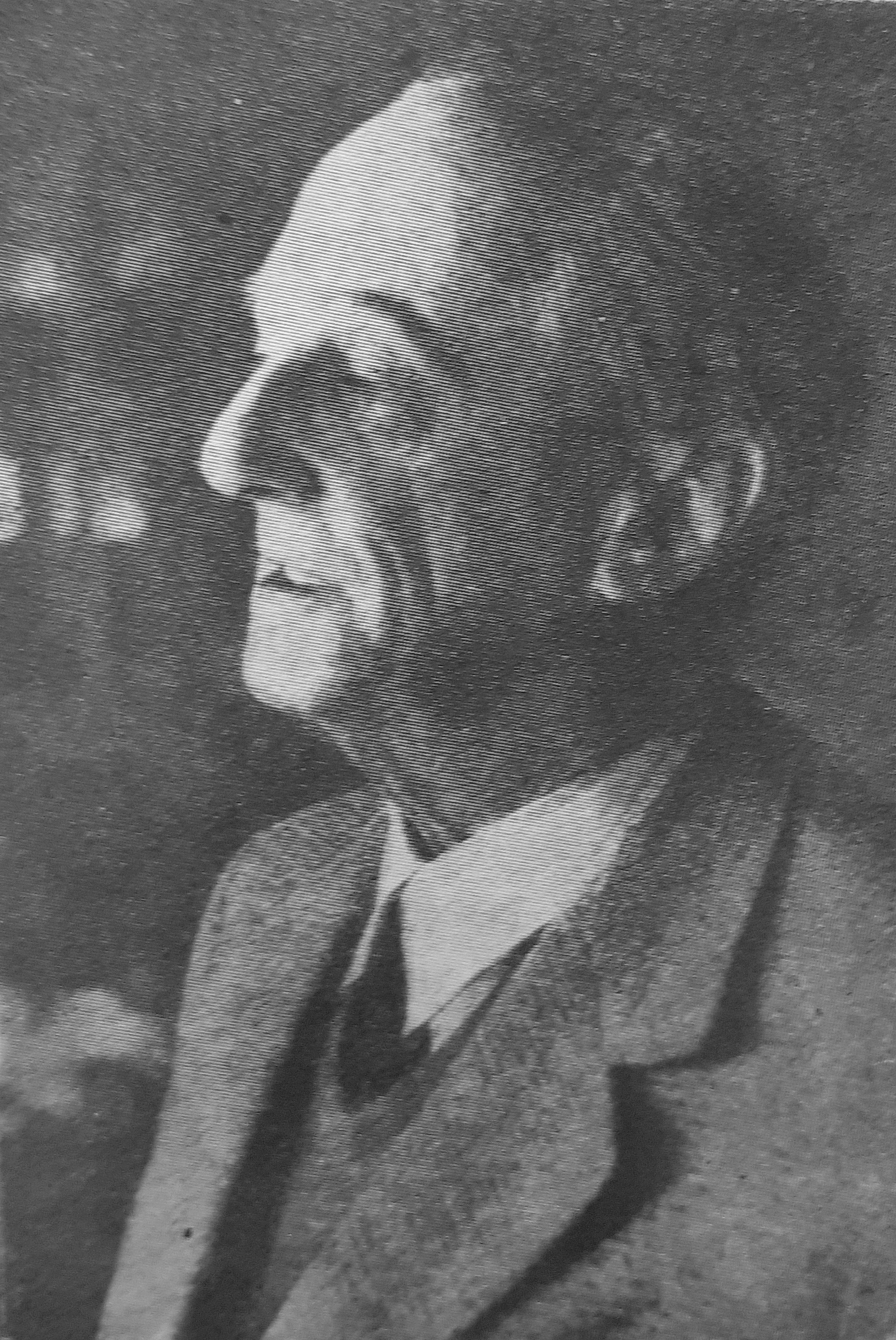
Steinhaus

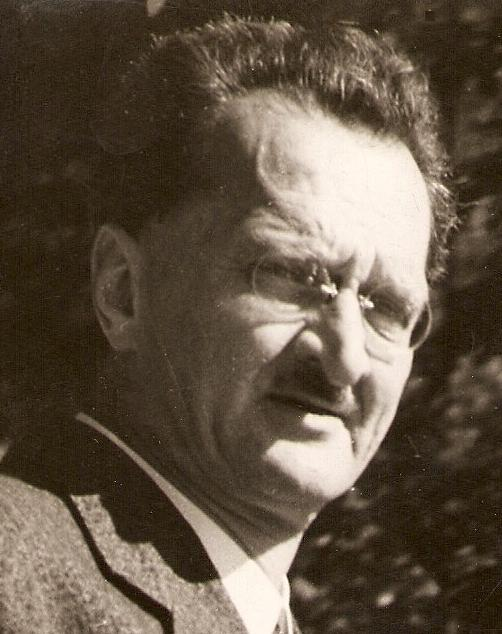
Ślebodziński

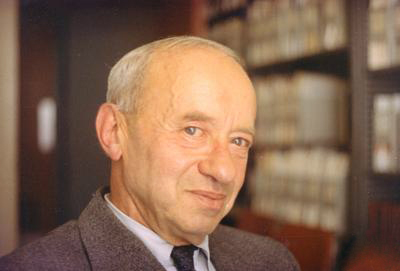
Tarski

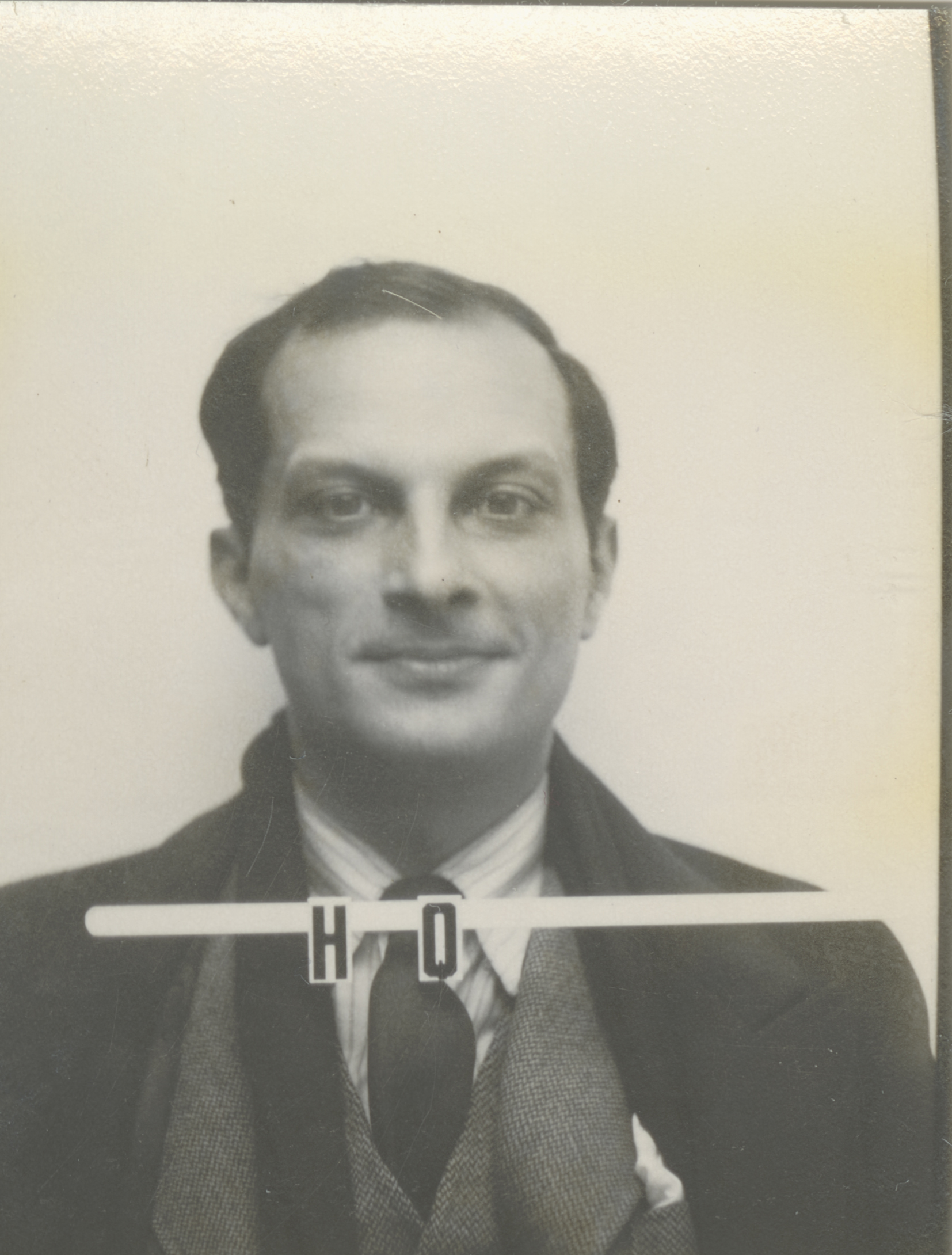
Ulam

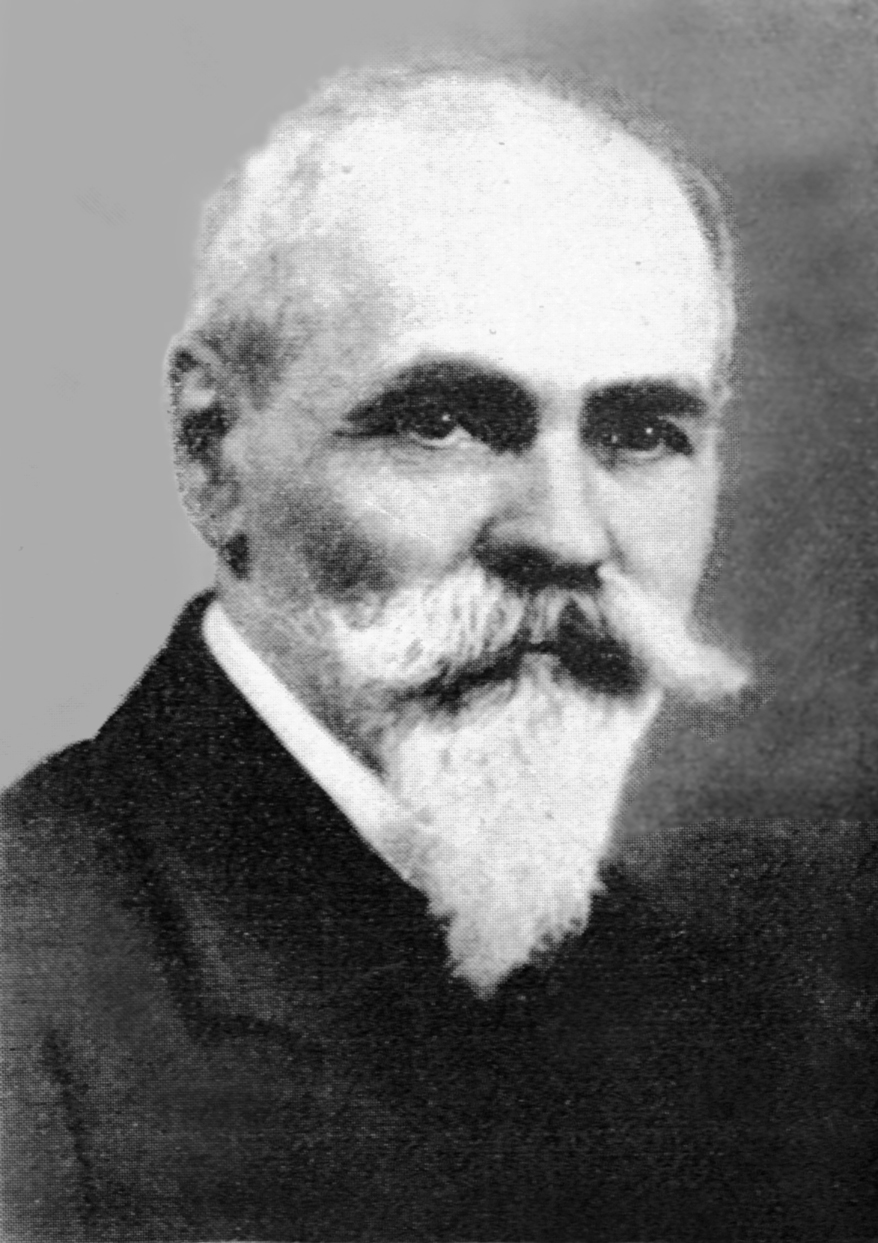
Zaremba

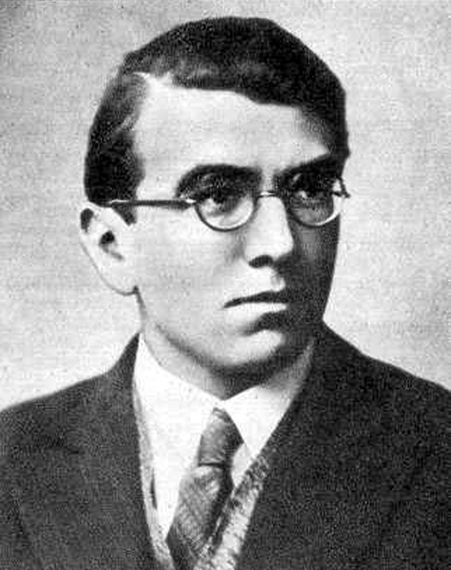
Zygalski

== Computer science ==
- Krzysztof R. Apt
- Paul Baran, American
- Krzysztof Cios, Polish-American
- Jarosław Duda
- Andrzej Ehrenfeucht, Polish-American
- Siemion Fajtlowicz, Polish-American, known for his Graffiti
- Aleksander Ihnatowicz
- Tomasz Imieliński, Polish-American
- Piotr Indyk
- Jacek Karpiński
- Marek Karpiński
- Marian Mazur
- Jan Mycielski, Polish-American
- Zdzislaw Pawlak
- Emil Leon Post, American
- Stanisław Radziszowski, Polish-American
- Andrew Targowski, Polish-American
- Jack Tramiel, Polish-American
- Andrzej Trybulec, Mizar system
- Stanisław Ulam
- Jan Węglarz
- Michał Zalewski
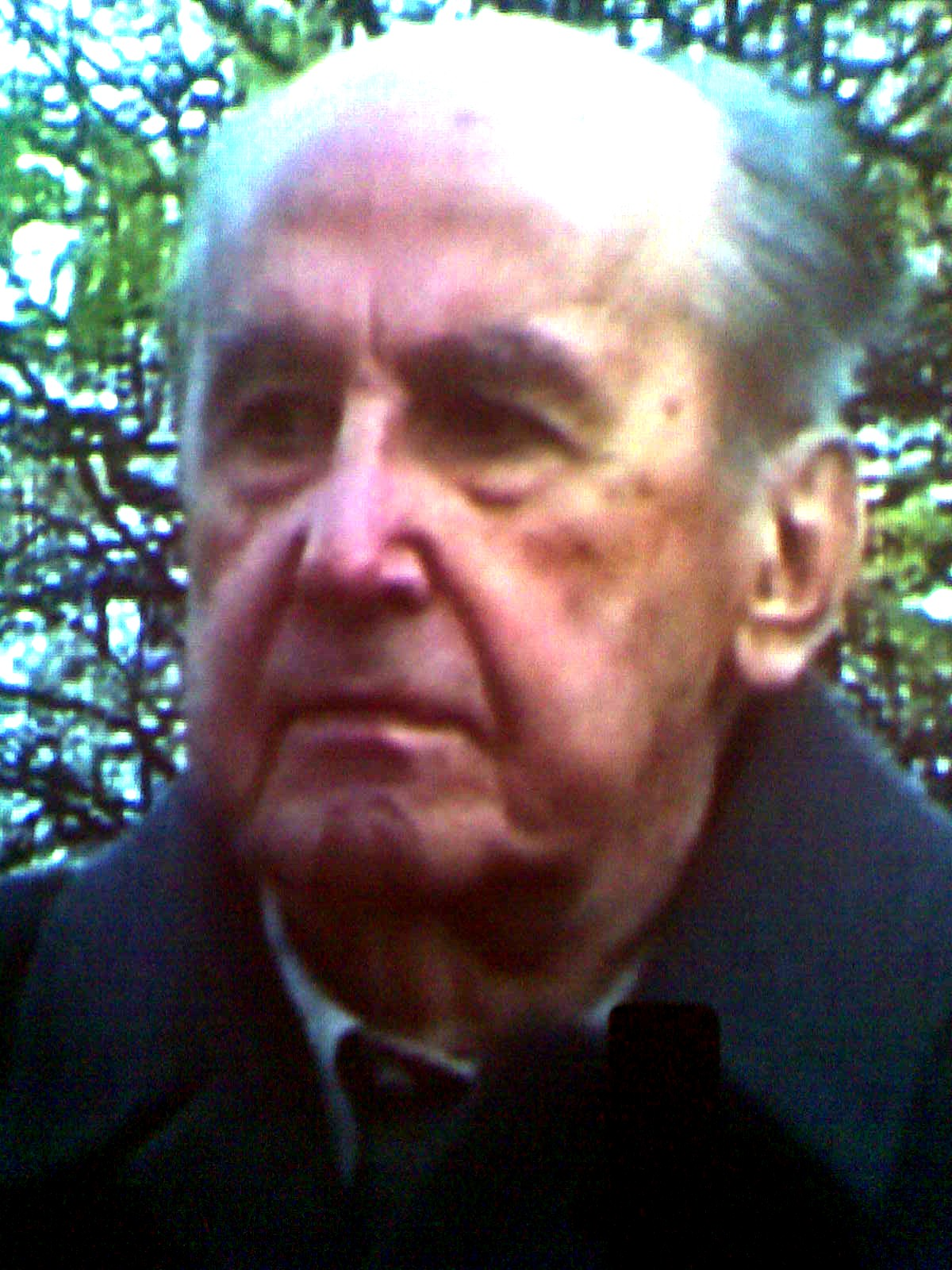
Karpiński

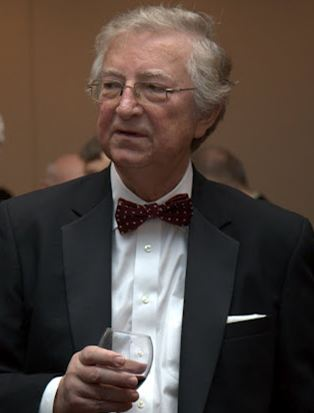
Targowski

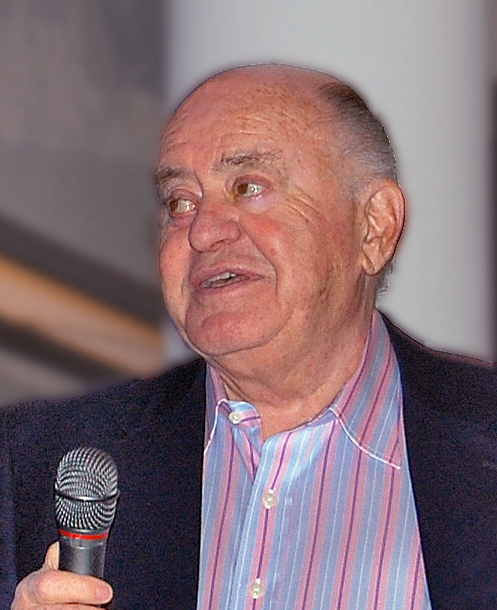
Tramiel

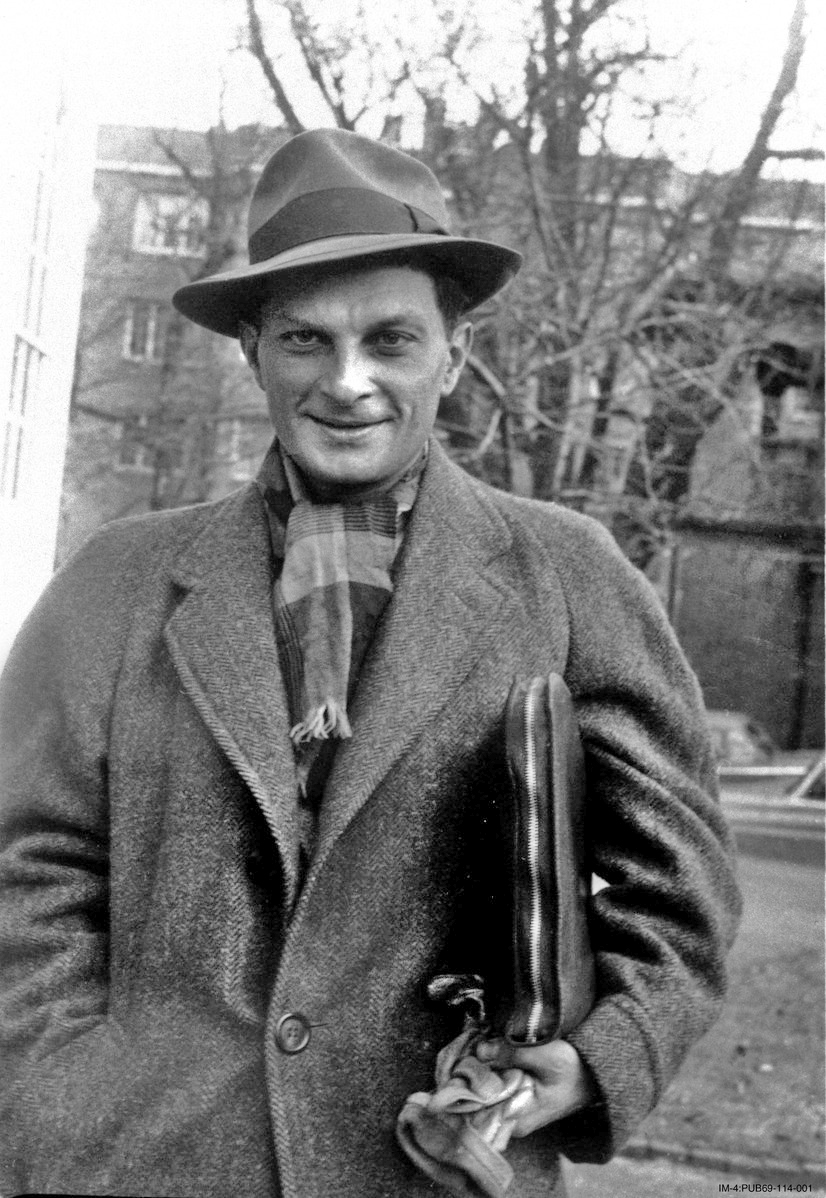
Ulam

== Linguistics ==
- Jolanta Antas
- Jerzy Bartmiński
- Jan Niecisław Baudouin de Courtenay (1845–1929), developed the theory of the phoneme and phonetic alternations.
- Andrzej Bogusławski (1931–2026), Russian-Polish-Russian lexicographer, philosopher of language, semioticist
- Aleksander Brückner (1856–1939), Slavicist and Polish-language lexicographer
- Kazimierz Bulas (1903–1970), Polish–English lexicographer (Kościuszko Foundation Dictionary)
- Jan Bystroń
- Jan Czekanowski
- Andrzej Gawroński
- Grzegorz Knapski
- Władysław Kopaliński
- Onufry Kopczyński (1736–1817), creator of Polish-grammar terminology
- Alfred Korzybski, originator of general semantics
- Mikołaj Kruszewski
- Jerzy Kuryłowicz
- Samuel Bogumił Linde (1771–1847), Polish-language lexicographer
- Jan Mączyński
- Halina Mierzejewska
- Jan Miodek
- Iwo Cyprian Pogonowski (1921–2016), Polish–English lexicographer, historian, and engineer
- Anna Siewierska
- Jan Stanisławski, Polish–English lexicographer
- Antoni Józef Śmieszek
- Michel Thomas
- Zdzisław Wąsik
- Anna Wierzbicka
- L. L. Zamenhof, inventor of Esperanto
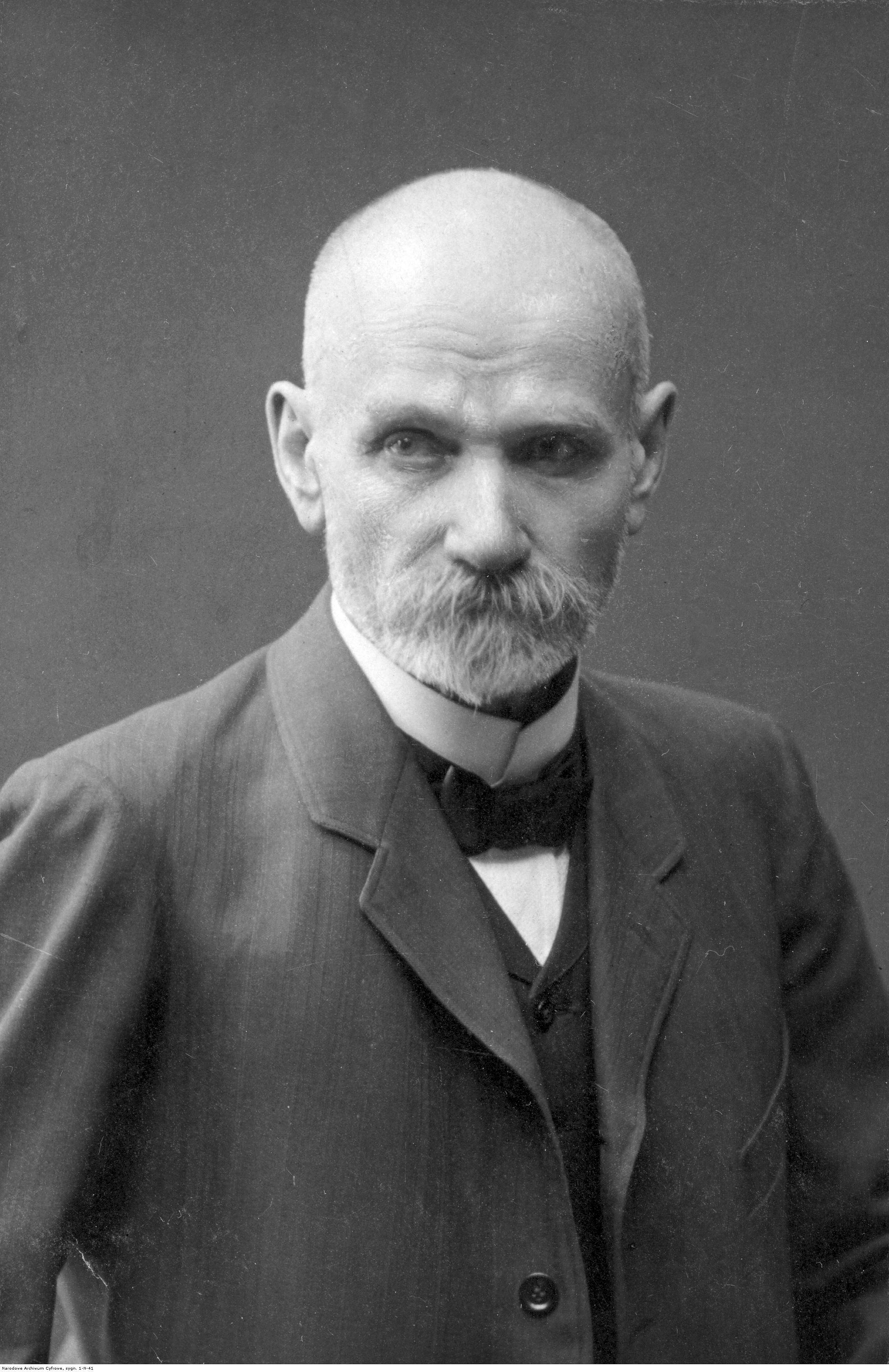
Baudouin de Courtenay

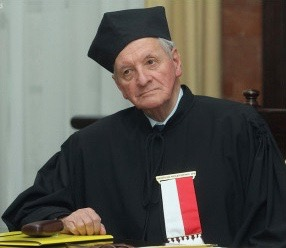
Bogusławski

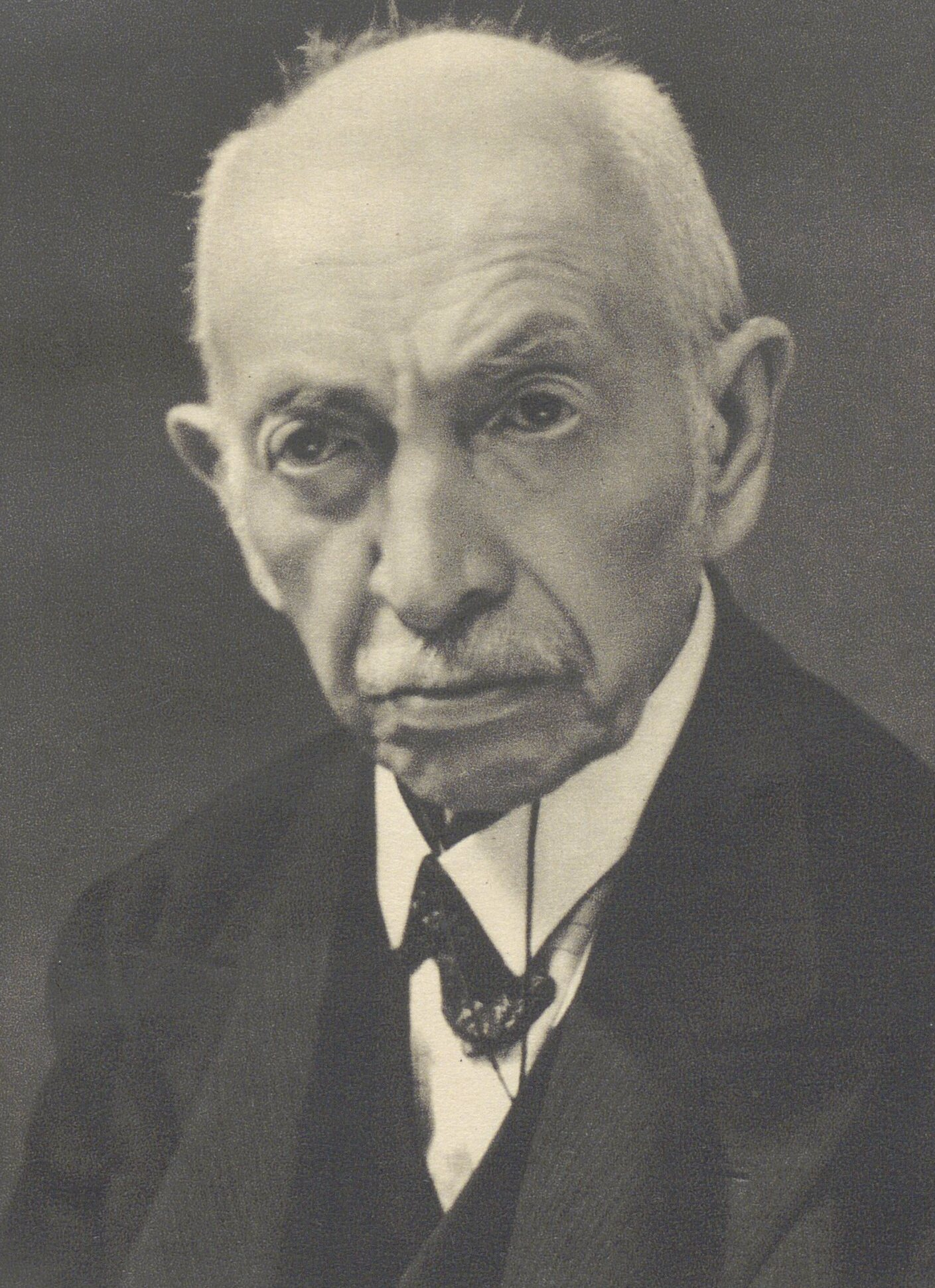
Brückner

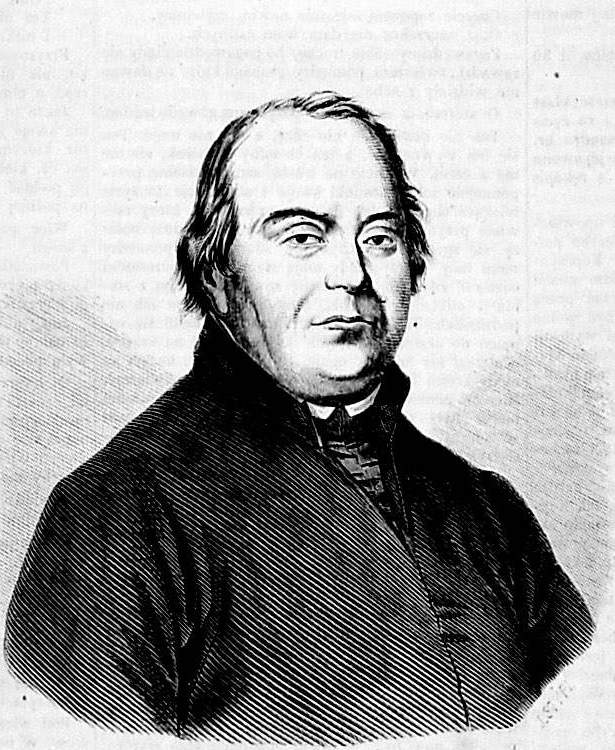
Kopczyński

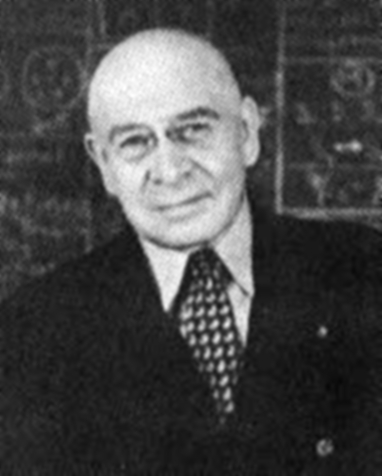
Korzybski

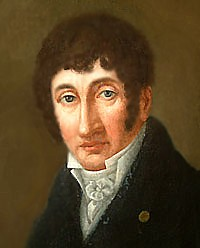
Linde

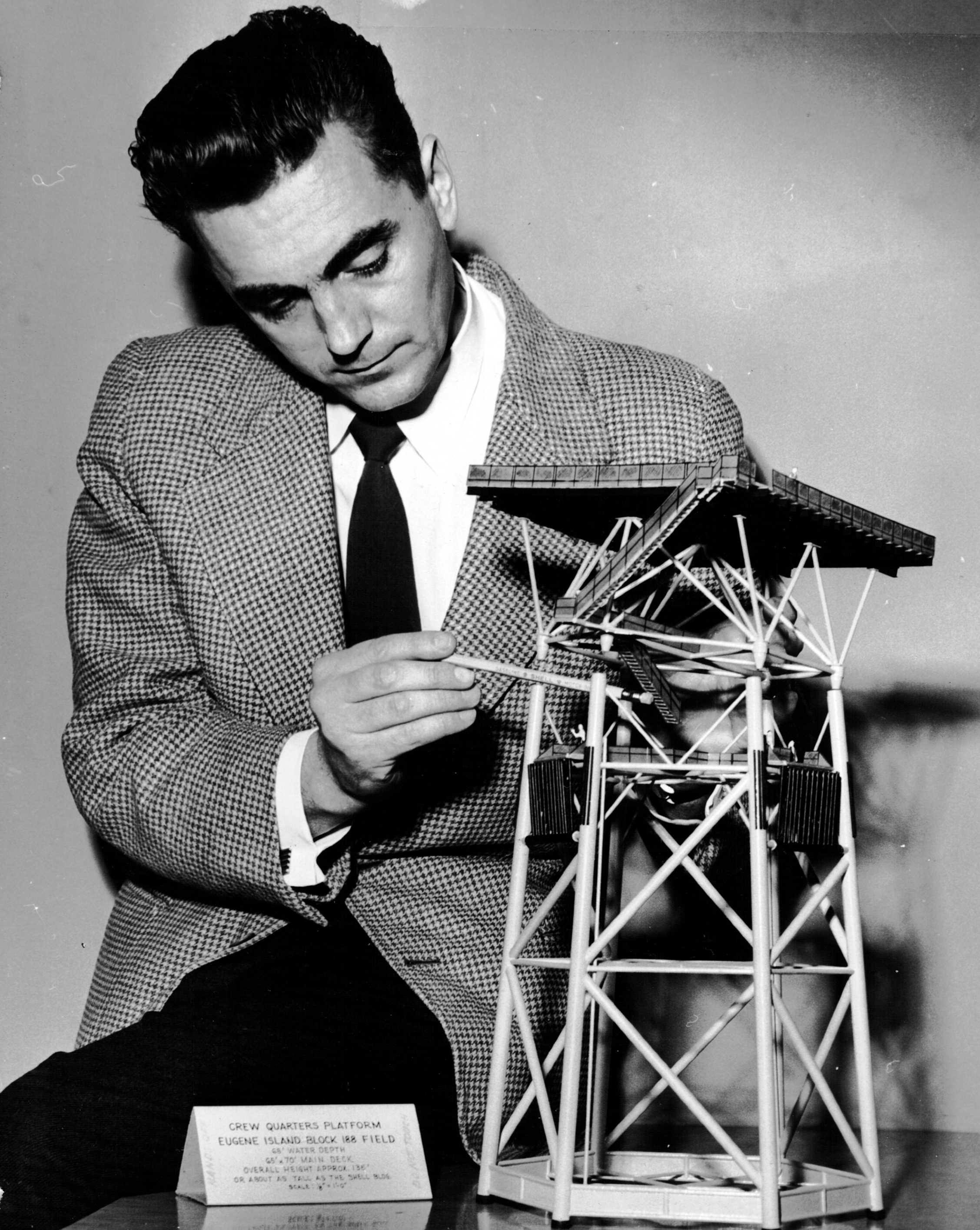
Pogonowski

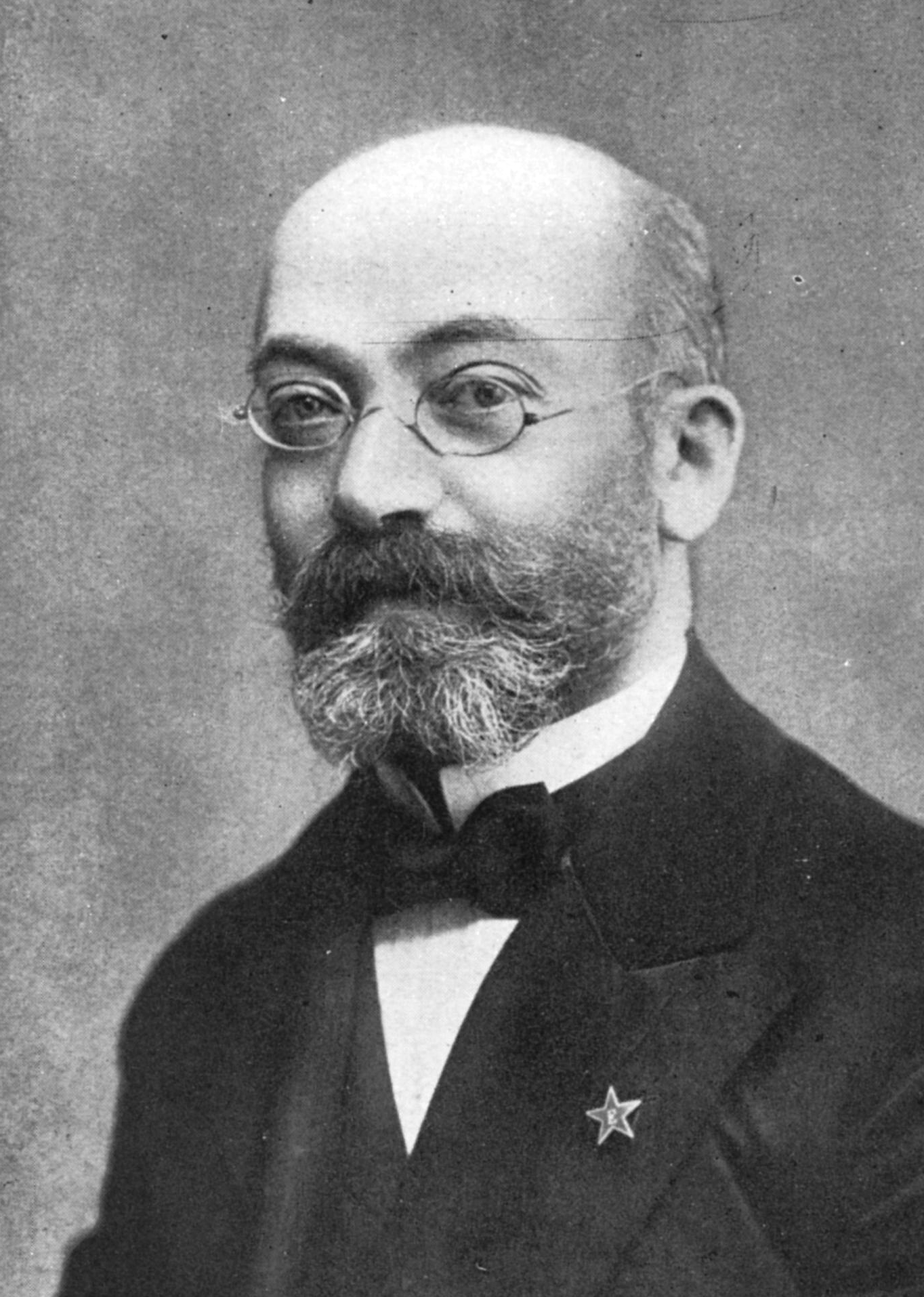
Zamenhof

== Invention ==
- Bruno Abakanowicz, mathematician, engineer, inventor of the integraph
- Stefan Bryła, first welded road bridge
- Mieczysław G. Bekker, Lunar Roving Vehicle
- Jan Czochralski, Czochralski process
- Juliusz Bogdan Deczkowski, medical equipment
- Stefan Drzewiecki in 1884 built the first electric-battery-powered submarine
- Jan Dzierżoń, first successful movable-frame beehive
- Leo Gerstenzang, Q-Tips
- Rudolf Gundlach, Gundlach Rotary Periscope
- Józef Hofmann, pneumatic shock absorbers
- Stefan Kudelski, Nagra audio recorders
- Stephanie Kwolek, inventor of Kevlar
- Kazimierz Leski, ballast tank funnels
- Janusz Liberkowski, Anecia Safety Capsule
- Ignacy Łukasiewicz, kerosene lamp, oil refinery
- Henryk Magnuski, walkie-talkie
- Julian Ochorowicz, precursor of radio and television; philosopher, psychologist
- Iwo Cyprian Pogonowski, petroleum-drilling platform inventor
- Kazimierz Proszyński, cinematic camera
- Marian Rejewski, broke German Enigma-machine ciphers, invented the cryptologic bomb
- Jerzy Różycki, invented "clock" method used in breaking German Enigma-machine ciphers
- Tadeusz Sendzimir, processing steel
- Władysław Starewicz, first puppet-animated film
- Abraham Stern, first computing-machine and device for calculating the square roots of numbers
- Wacław Struszyński, seaborne direction finding antenna, which made a vital contribution to the defeat of U-boats in the Battle of the Atlantic
- Jan Szczepanik, television patents
- Władysław Tryliński, trylinka
- Józef Tykociński, sound film
- Stefan Tyszkiewicz, automotive and audio improvements
- Mieczysław Wolfke, precursor of holography
- Casimir Zeglen, bullet-proof vest
- Henryk Zygalski, Zygalski sheets
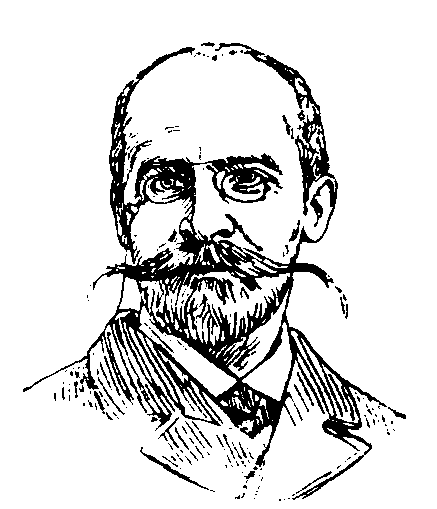
Abakanowicz

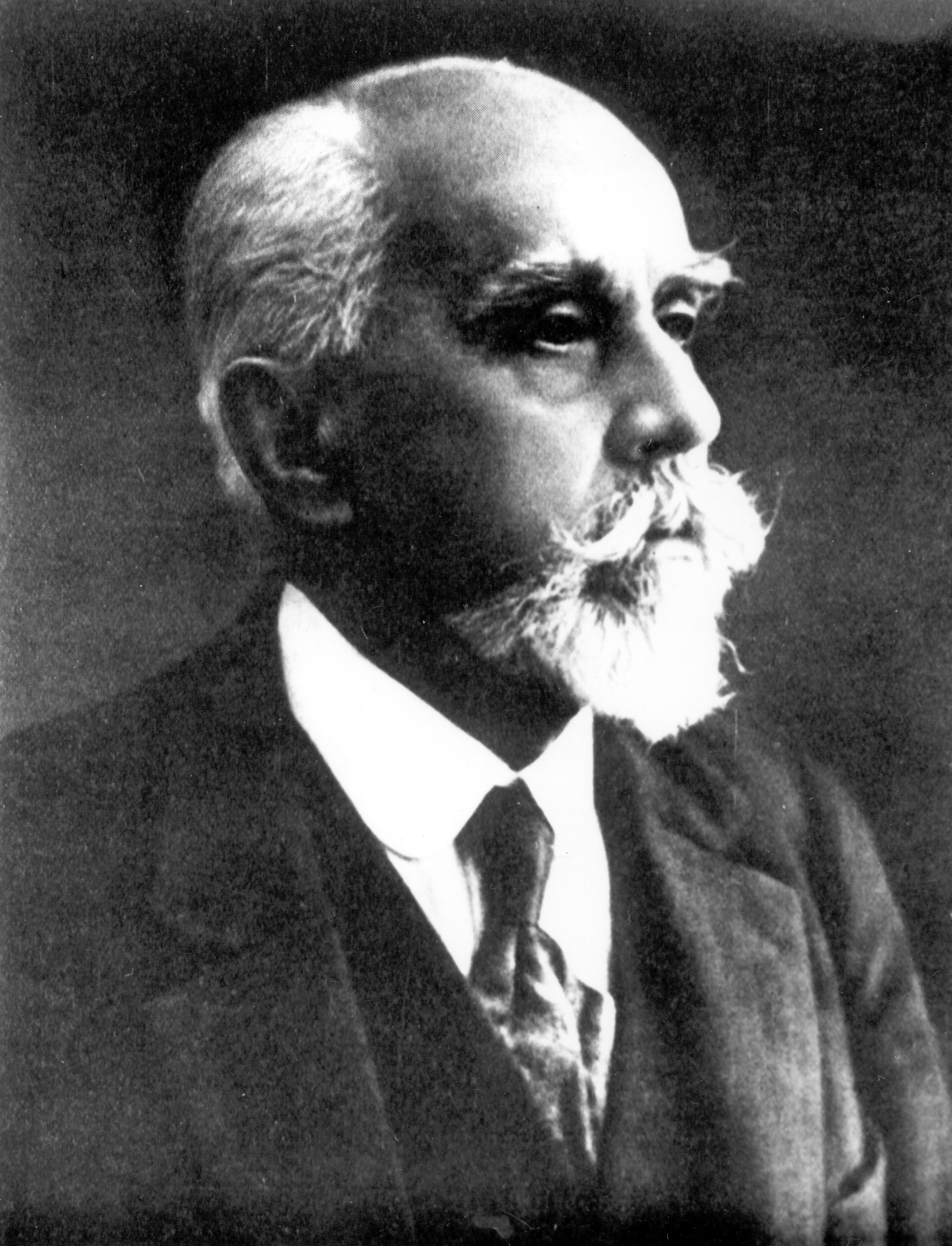
Drzewiecki

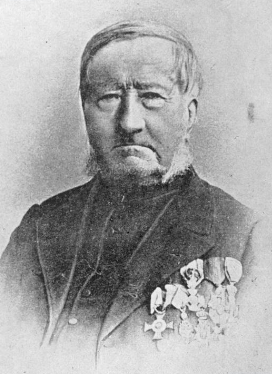
Dzierżoń

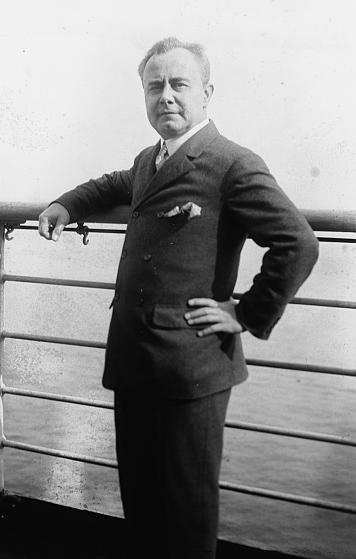
Hofmann

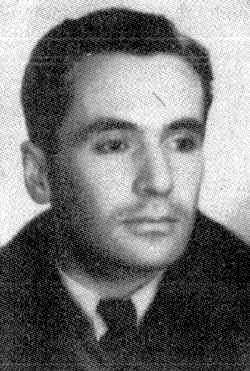
Leski

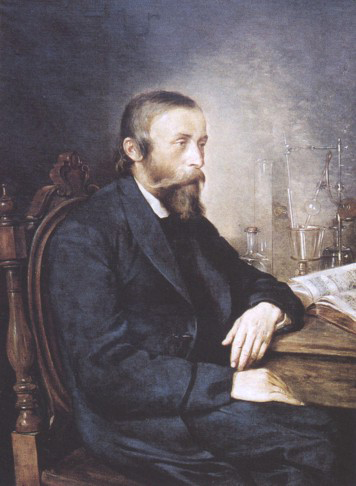
Łukasiewicz

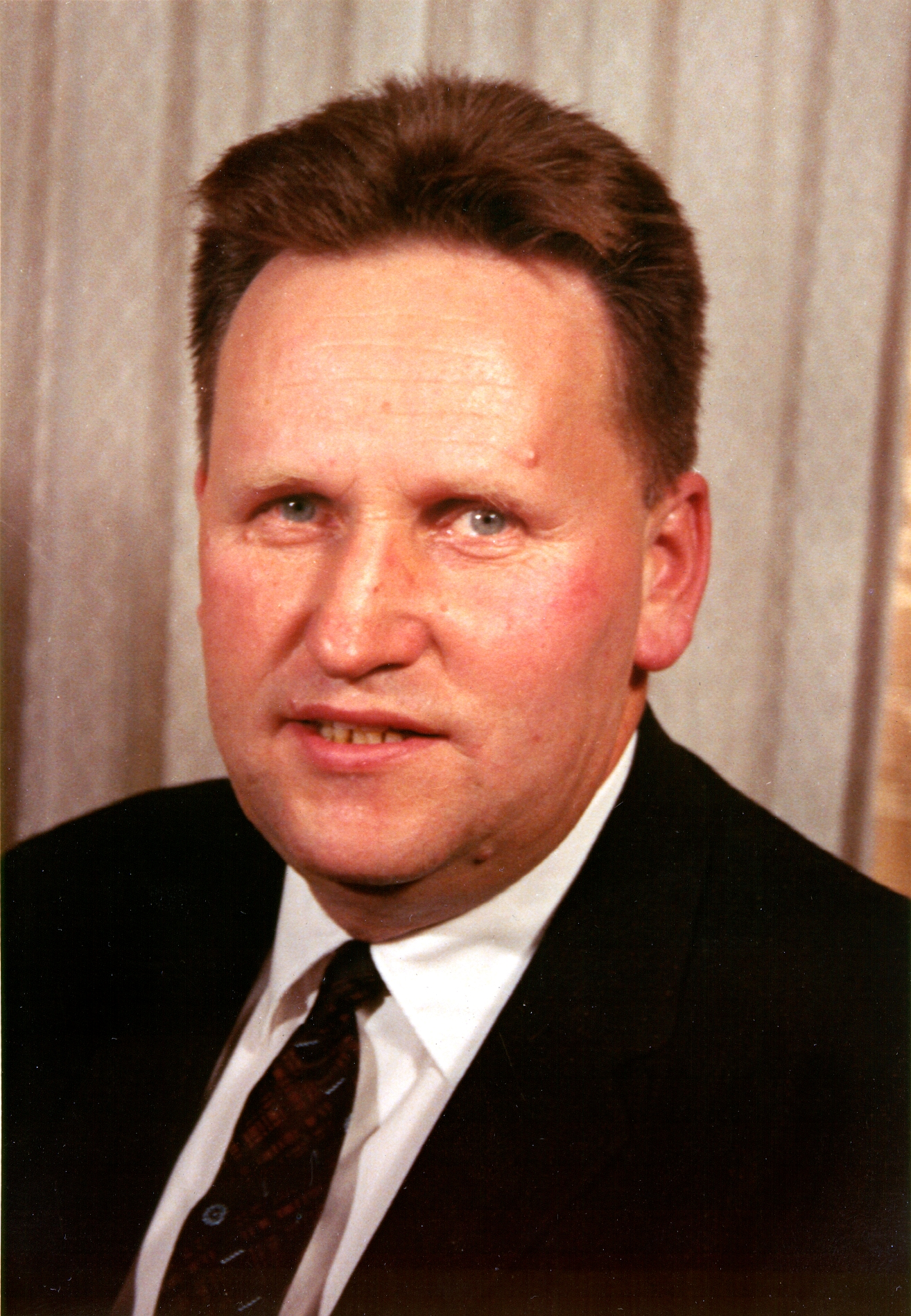
Magnuski

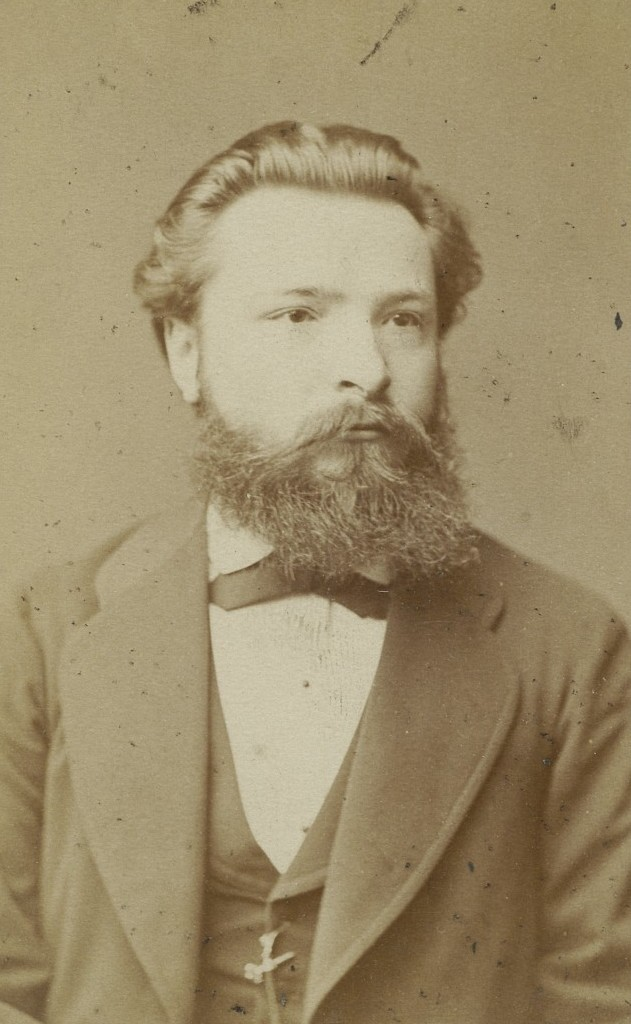
Ochorowicz

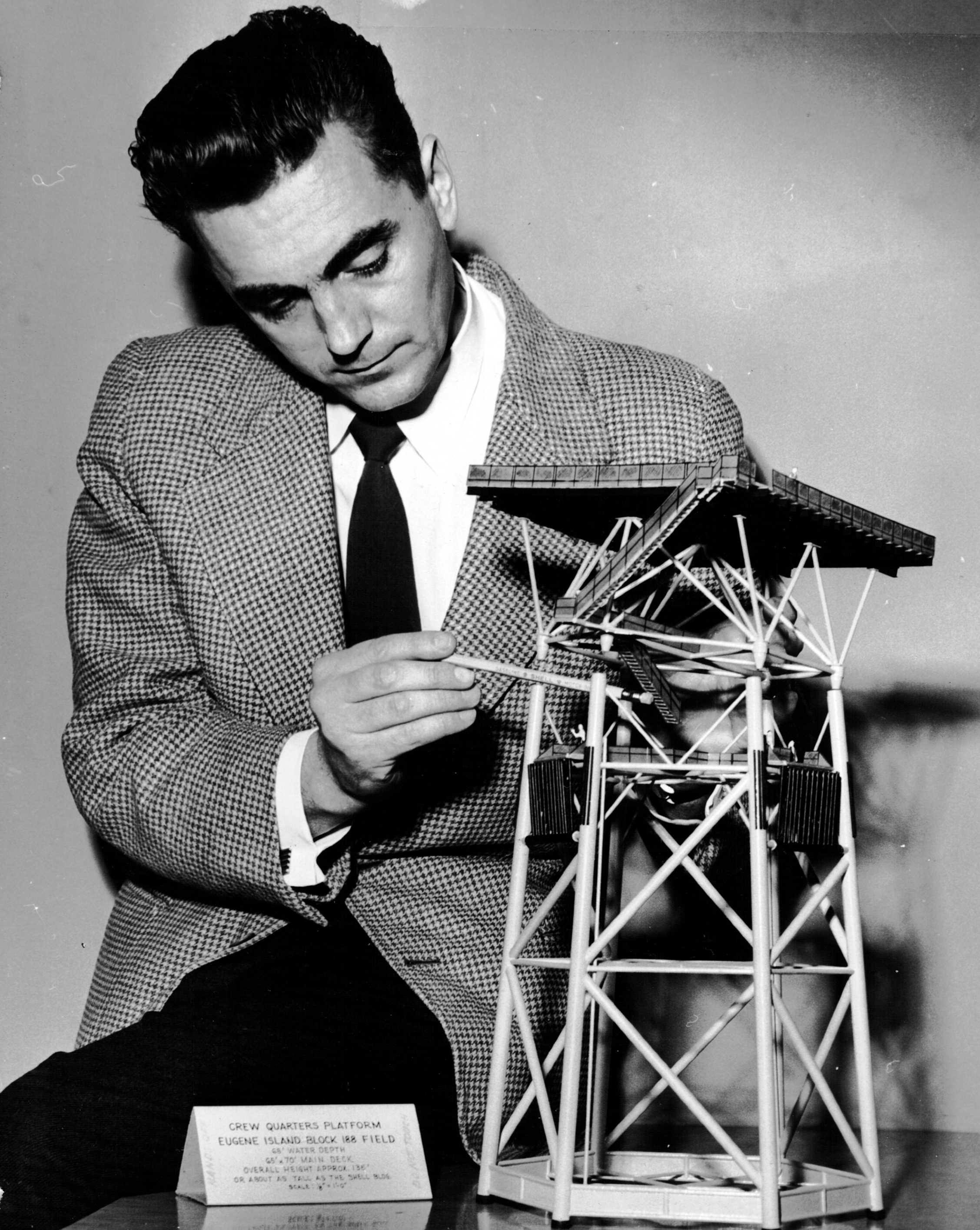
Pogonowski

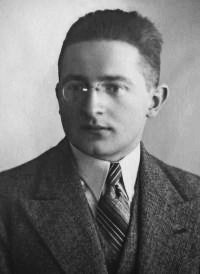
Rejewski

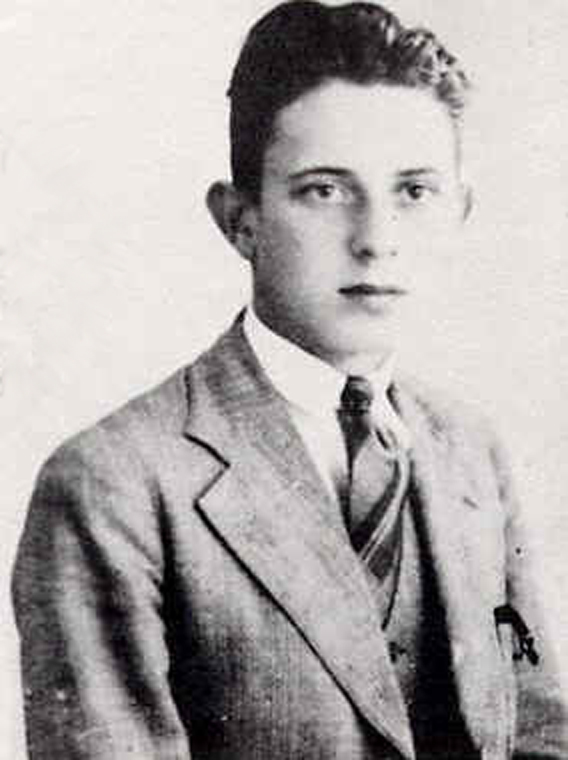
Różycki

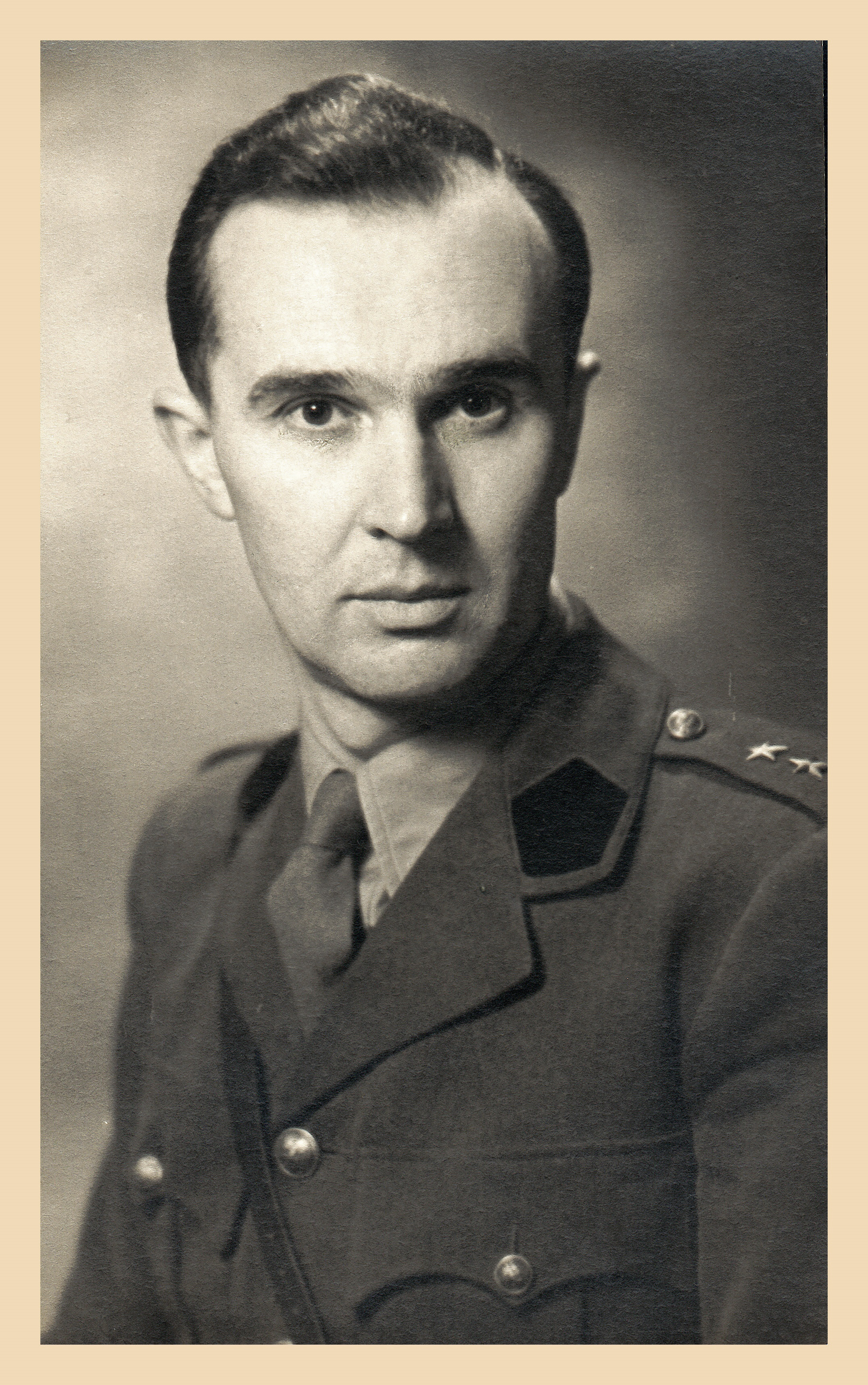
Struszyński

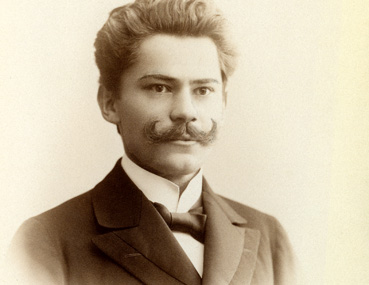
Szczepanik

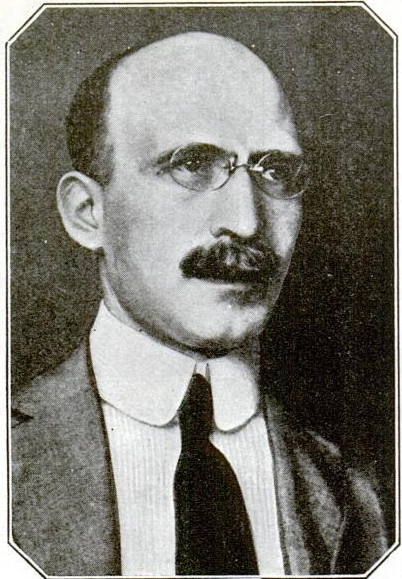
Tykociński

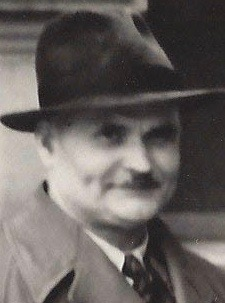
Tyszkiewicz

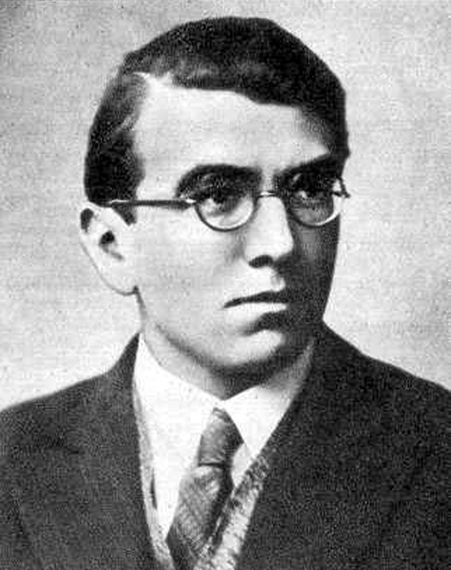
Zygalski

== Engineering ==
- Karol Adamiecki
- Krzysztof Arciszewski
- Mieczysław G. Bekker, first moon rover
- Włodzimierz Błasiak
- Stefan Bryła, first welded road bridge
- Romuald Cebertowicz, soil solidification
- Zdzisław Celiński
- Georges Charpak, particle detector
- Jerzy Dąbrowski, designer of PZL.37 Łoś bomber
- Mikhail Dolivo-Dobrovolsky, Polish-Russian engineer, electrician, and inventor
- Adam Freytag
- Alvin Gajadhur, politician, statesman, chemical engineer, and educator
- Alfons Grotowski, sanitary engineer, co-designer of the waterworks and sewage network of Warsaw, Poland
- Rudolf Gundlach, tank designer
- Kazimierz Gzowski
- Edward Jan Habich
- Tytus Maksymilian Huber
- Jacek Jędruch
- Stanisław Kierbedź
- Stefan Kudelski, electronics engineer, inventor of the Nagra tape recorder
- Józef Kosacki, Polish mine detector
- Janusz Liberkowski, inventor
- Henryk Magnuski, walkie-talkie
- Ernest Malinowski, 19th-century constructor of Peru's Ferrovias Central, the world's highest railway at the time
- Henry Millicer, aviation
- Ralph Modjeski, bridge designer
- Zenon Mróz, materials science engineer
- Jan Nagórski, first man to fly over the North Pole
- Martin Ostoja-Starzewski, engineering scientist
- Antoni Patek, pioneer in watchmaking and a creator of Patek Philippe & Co.
- Iwo Cyprian Pogonowski
- Zygmunt Puławski, designer of PZL P.11 fighter
- Bogdan Raczkowski, engineer and urbanist in Bydgoszcz
- Ludwik Regamey, engineer and social activist
- Wojciech Rostafiński, NASA
- Kazimierz Siemienowicz, pioneer of rocket
- Stefan Tyszkiewicz, automotive engineer, inventor of the airport luggage trolley
- Aleksander Wachniewski
- Stanisław Wigura, aviation
- Piotr Wilniewczyc, weaponry
- Jan Zarzycki, telecommunications
- Franciszek Żwirko, aviation
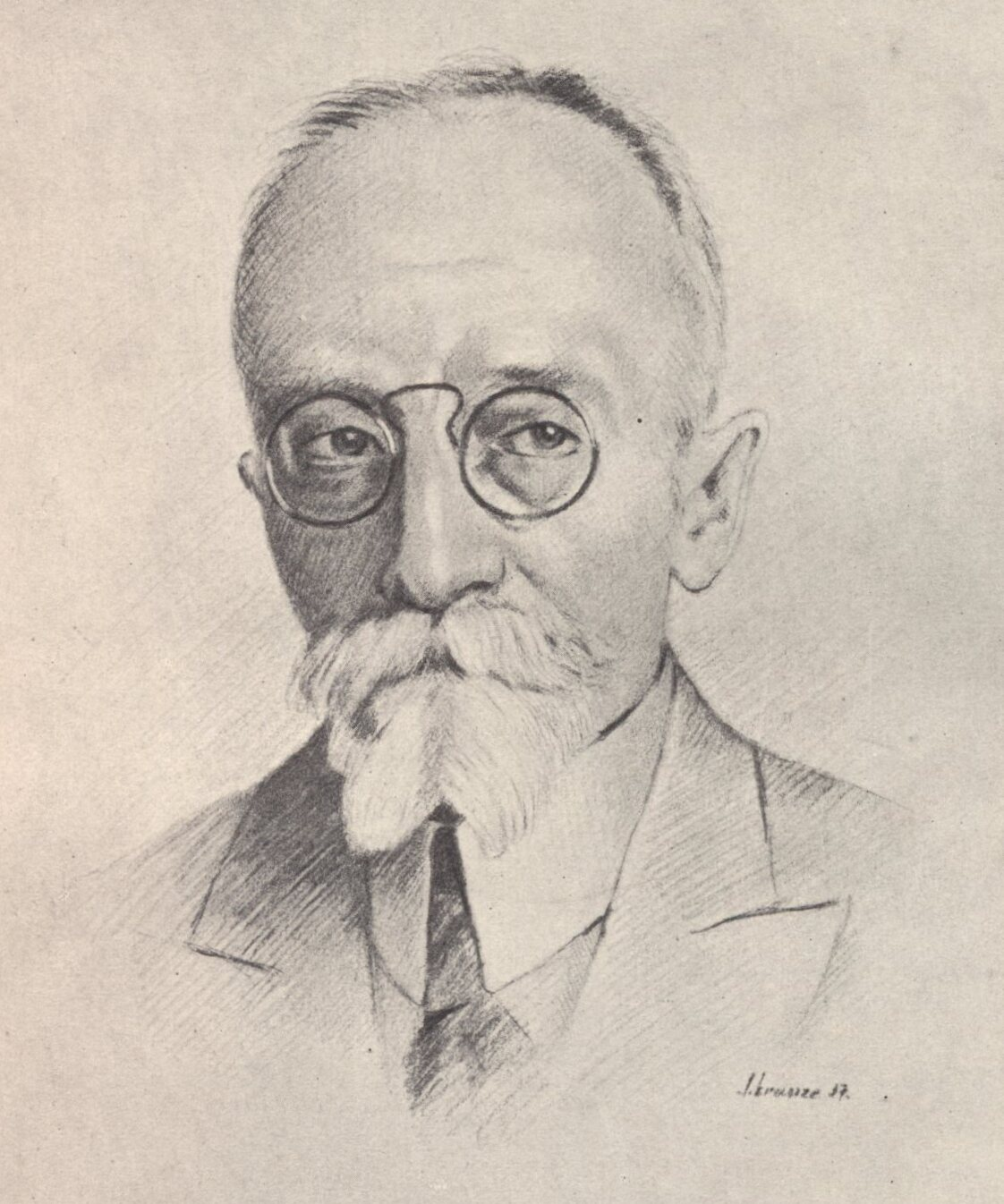
Adamiecki

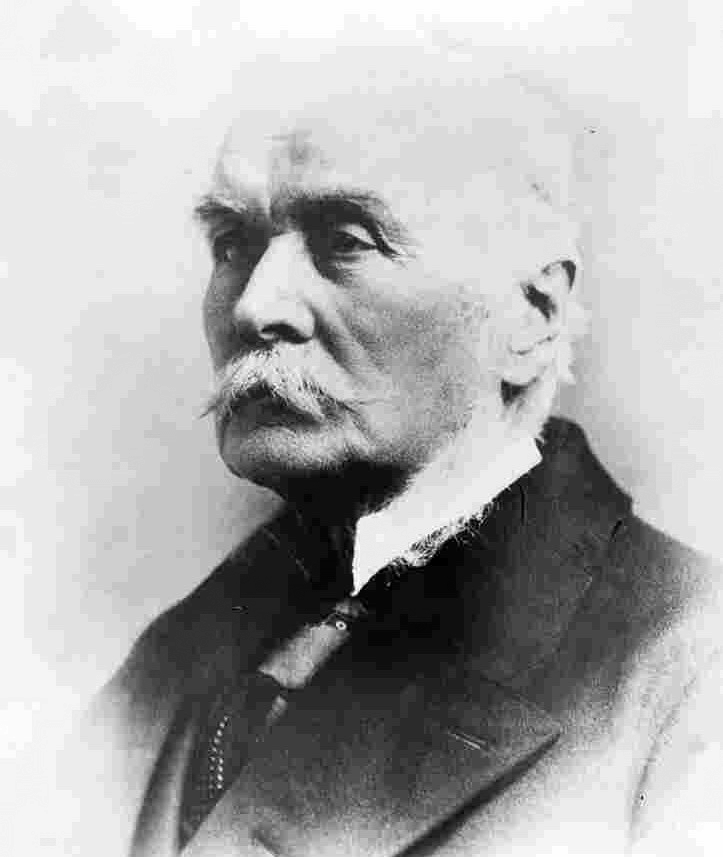
Gzowski

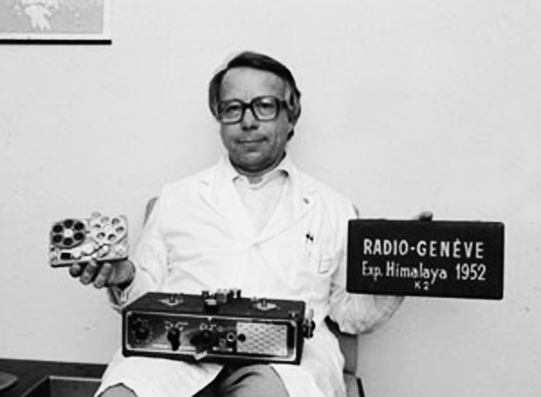
Kudelski

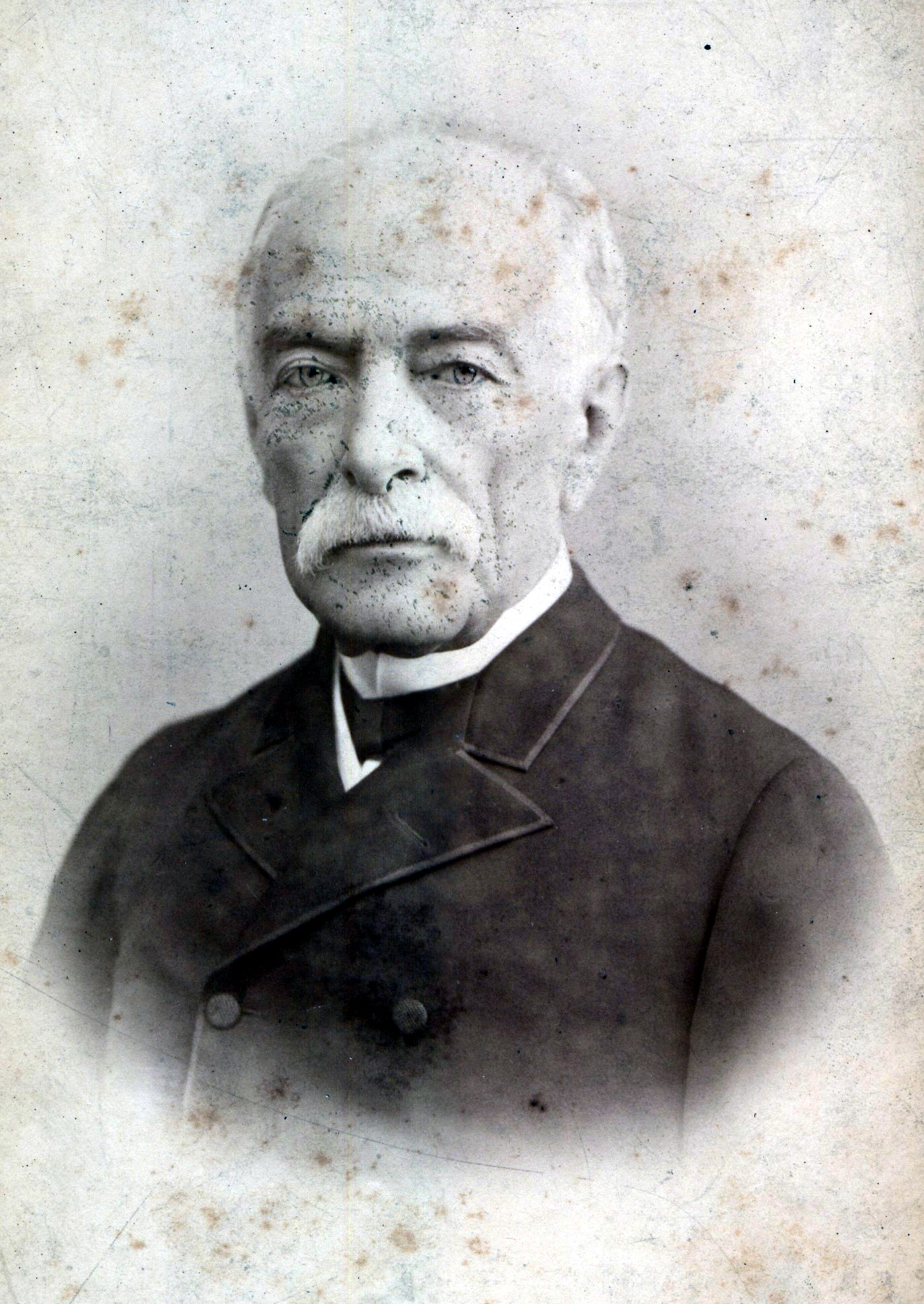
Malinowski

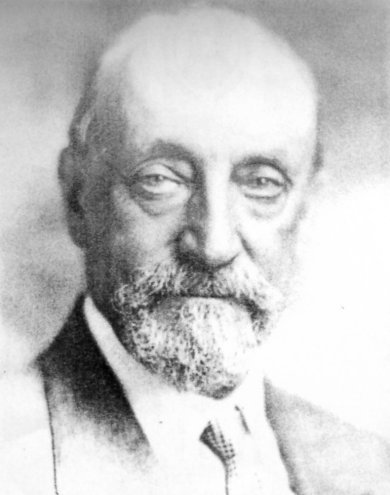
Modjeski

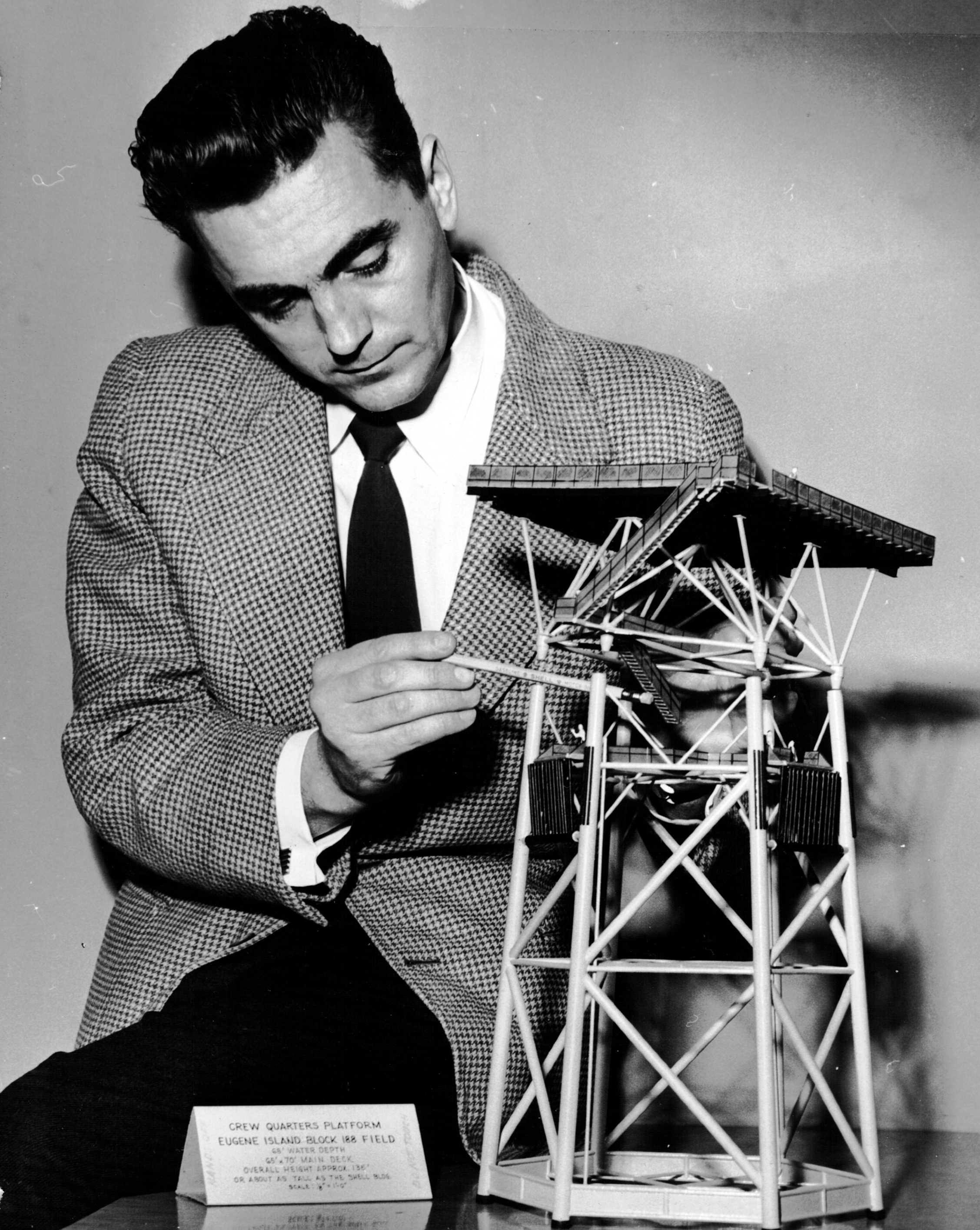
Pogonowski

== Social sciences ==
- Tadeusz Andrzejewski, archeologist, Egyptologist
- Zygmunt Bauman, sociologist, philosopher
- Stefan Błachowski, psychologist
- Maria Czaplicka, anthropologist
- Kazimierz Dąbrowski, psychologist
- Jan Władysław Dawid, psychologist
- Tomasz Drezner, Renaissance jurist
- Agnieszka Dudzińska, sociologist
- Barbara Engelking, sociologist
- Zygmunt Gloger, ethnographer, archaeologist, historian
- Kazimierz Godłowski, historian and archeologist
- Ludwig Gumplowicz, a founder of sociology
- Norbert Guterman
- Alicja Iwańska, sociologist
- Franciszek Kasparek, jurist, professor of international law, rector of Kraków University
- Oskar Kolberg, ethnographer
- Józef Kostrzewski, archeologist, museologist
- Marek Kotański, psychologist
- Leon Kozłowski (1892–1944), archeologist; Prime Minister of Poland, 1934–35.
- Ludwik Krzywicki, anthropologist, economist, sociologist
- Jan Kubary, naturalist, ethnographer
- Hersch Lauterpacht, creator of the legal concept of crimes against humanity
- Raphael Lemkin, creator of the legal concept of genocide
- Andrzej Łobaczewski, psychiatrist, originator of political ponerology
- Wiesław Łukaszewski, psychologist
- Bronisław Malinowski, anthropologist
- Władysław Markiewicz, sociologist
- Kazimierz Michałowski, archeologist, Egyptologist
- Karol Myśliwiec, archeologist, Egyptologist
- Julian Ochorowicz, psychologist, philosopher, inventor
- Maria Ossowska, sociologist
- Stanisław Ossowski, sociologist
- Bronisław Piłsudski, cultural anthropologist
- Jadwiga Staniszkis, sociologist
- Paweł Śpiewak, sociologist
- Henryk Stroband, jurist and mayor of Toruń
- Tadeusz Sulimirski, historian and archeologist
- Jerzy Szacki, historian of ideas
- Zbigniew Szafrański, Egyptologist, archeologist
- Jacek Szmatka, sociologist
- Piotr Sztompka, sociologist
- Edmund Wnuk-Lipiński, sociologist, founder of PAN's Institute of Political Studies
- Robert Zajonc, psychologist
- Florian Znaniecki, sociologist
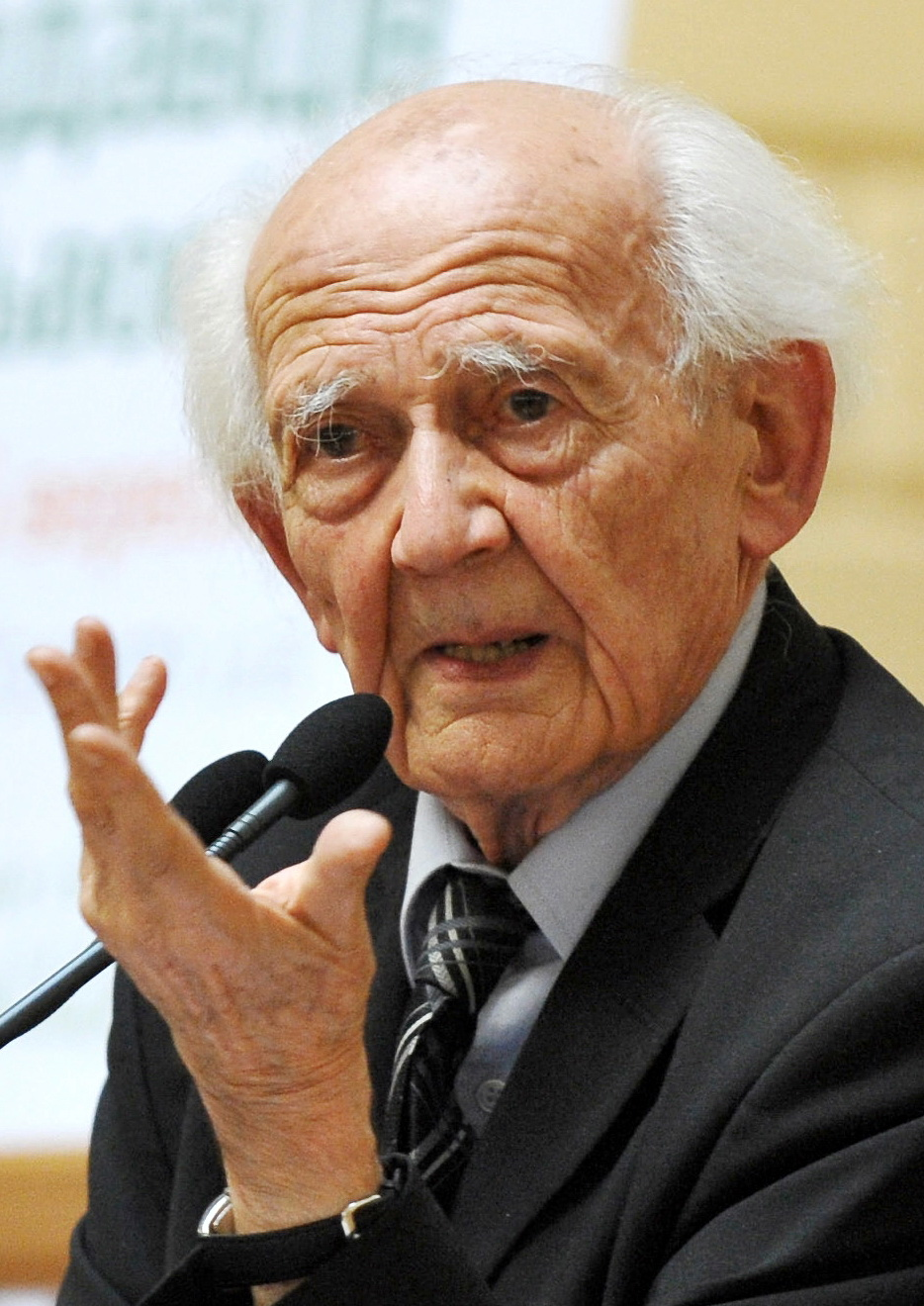
Bauman

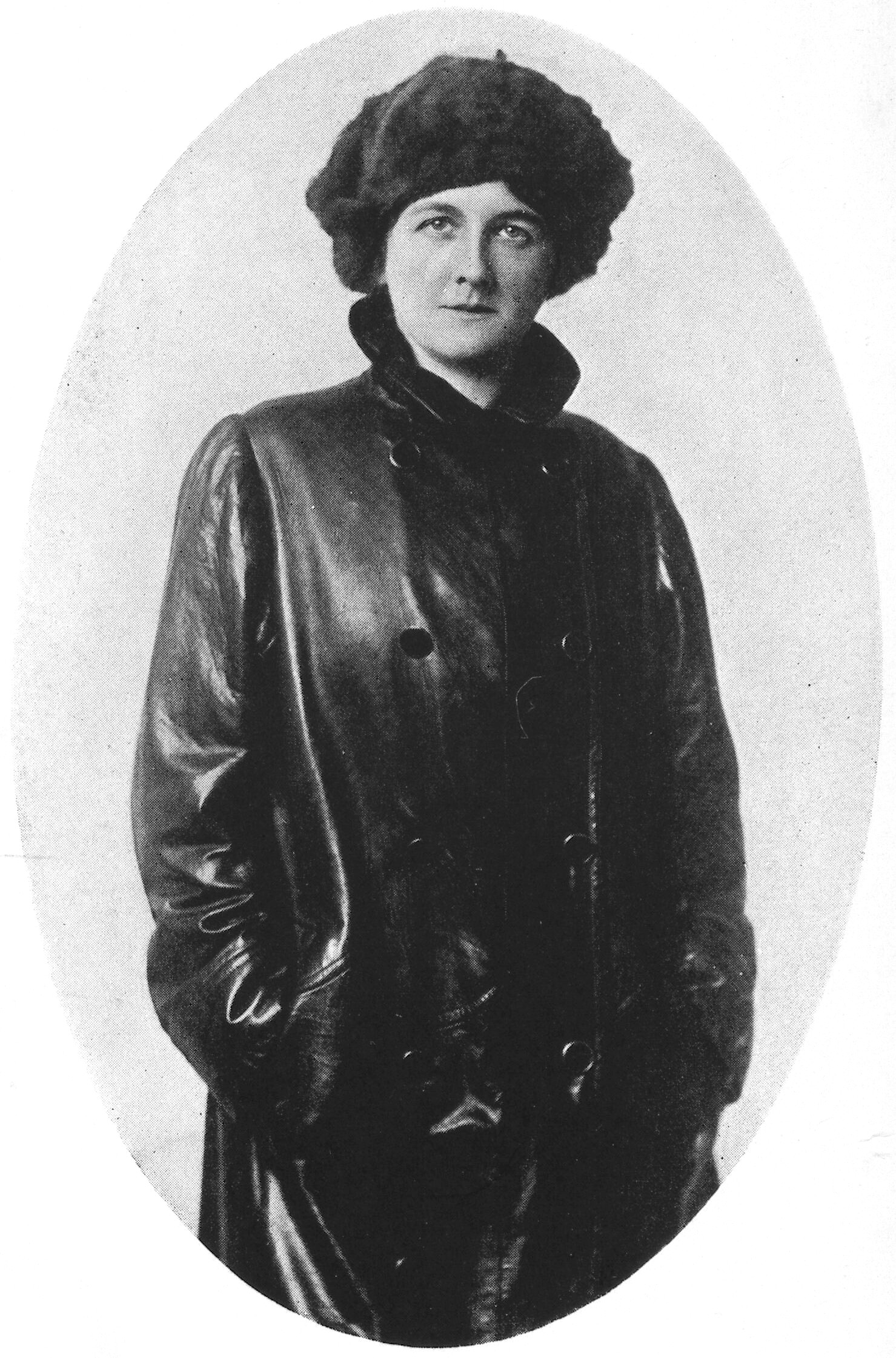
Czaplicka

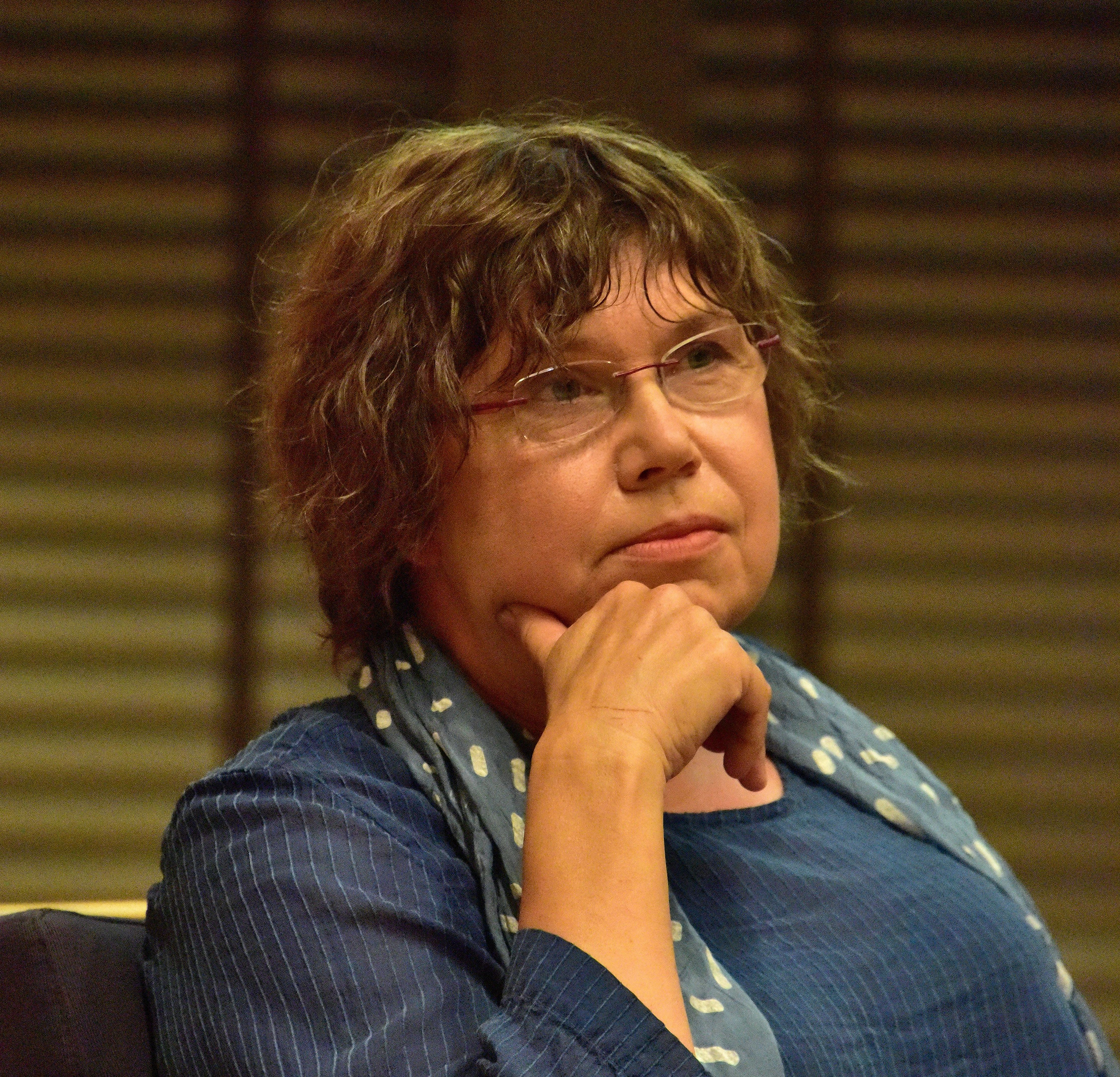
Engelking

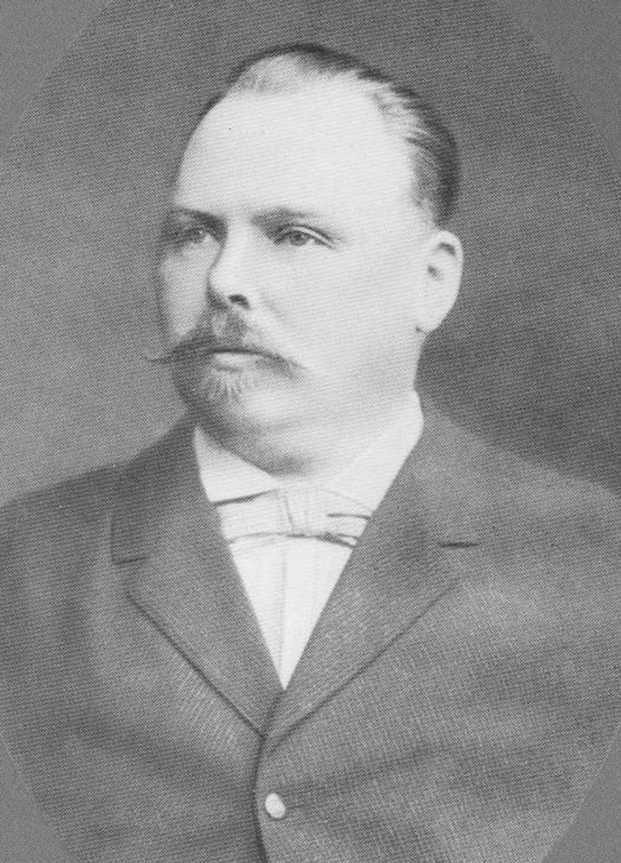
Gloger

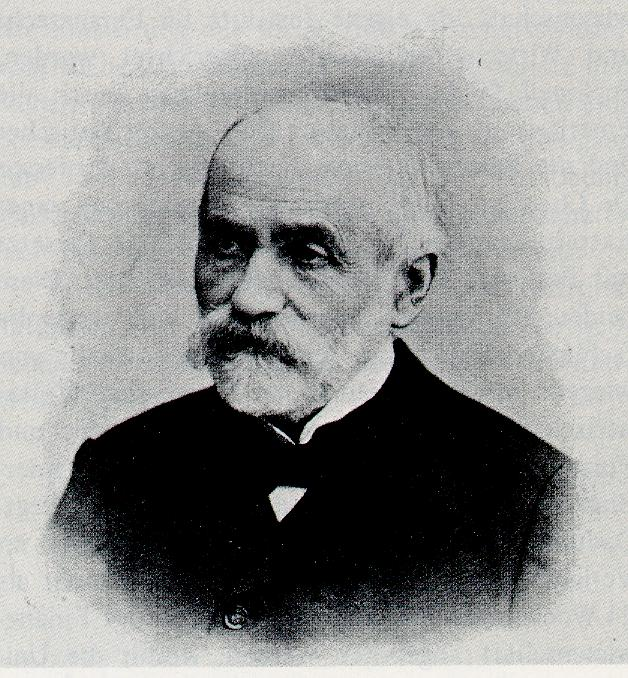
Gumplowicz

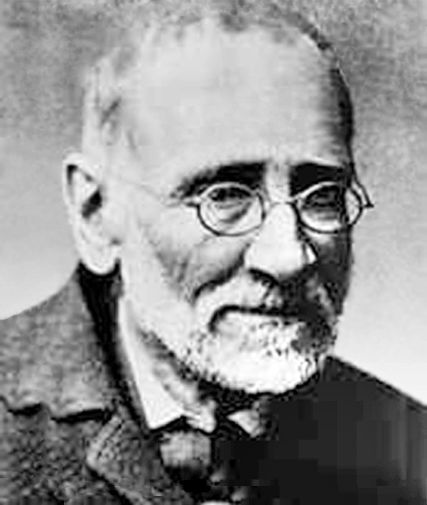
Kolberg

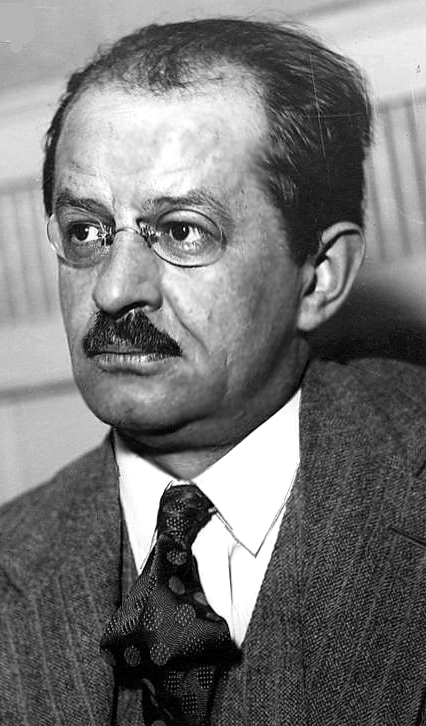
Kozłowski

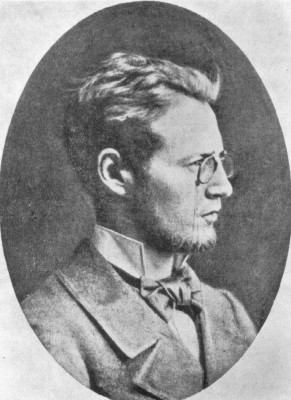
Krzywicki

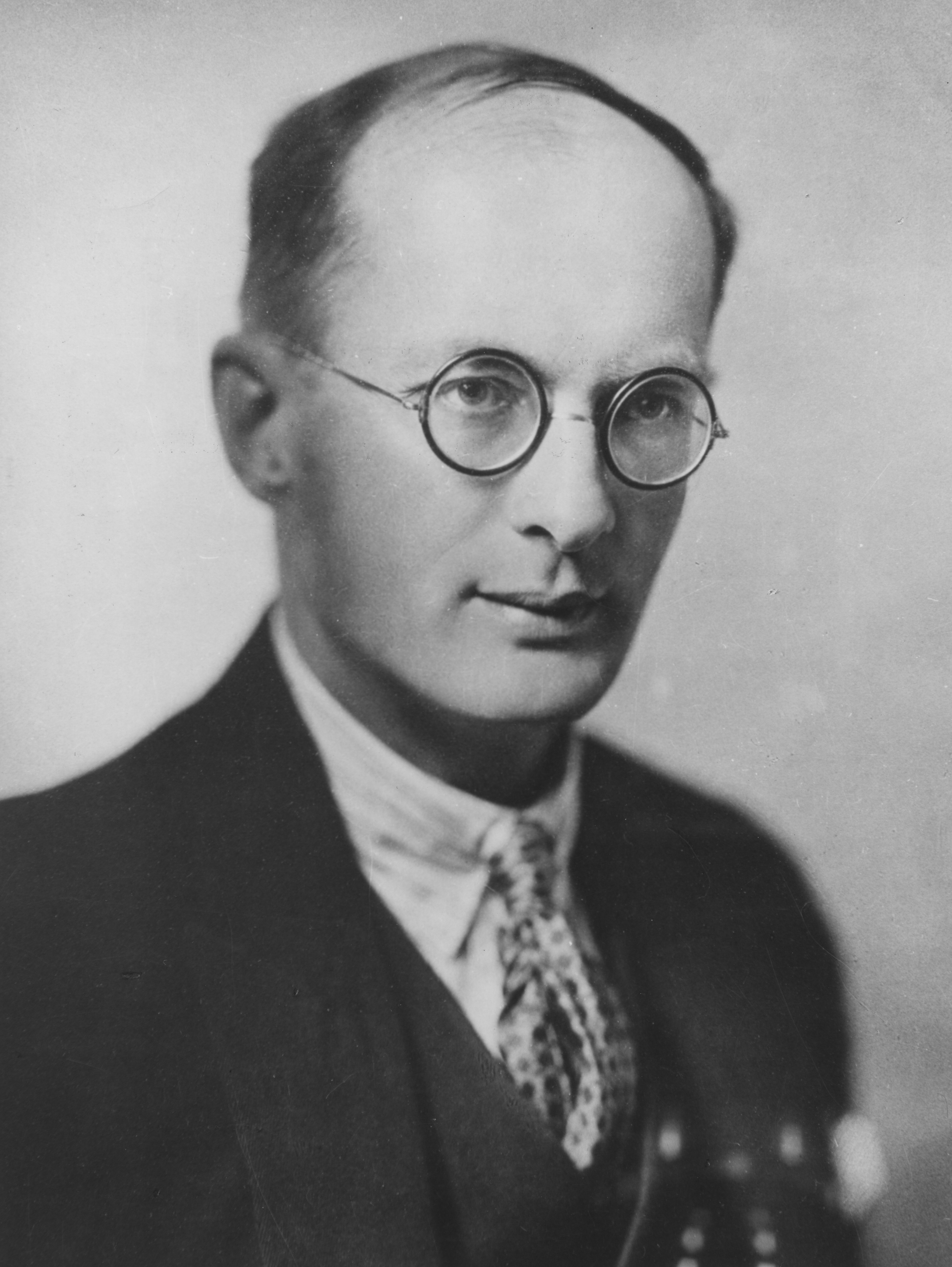
Malinowski

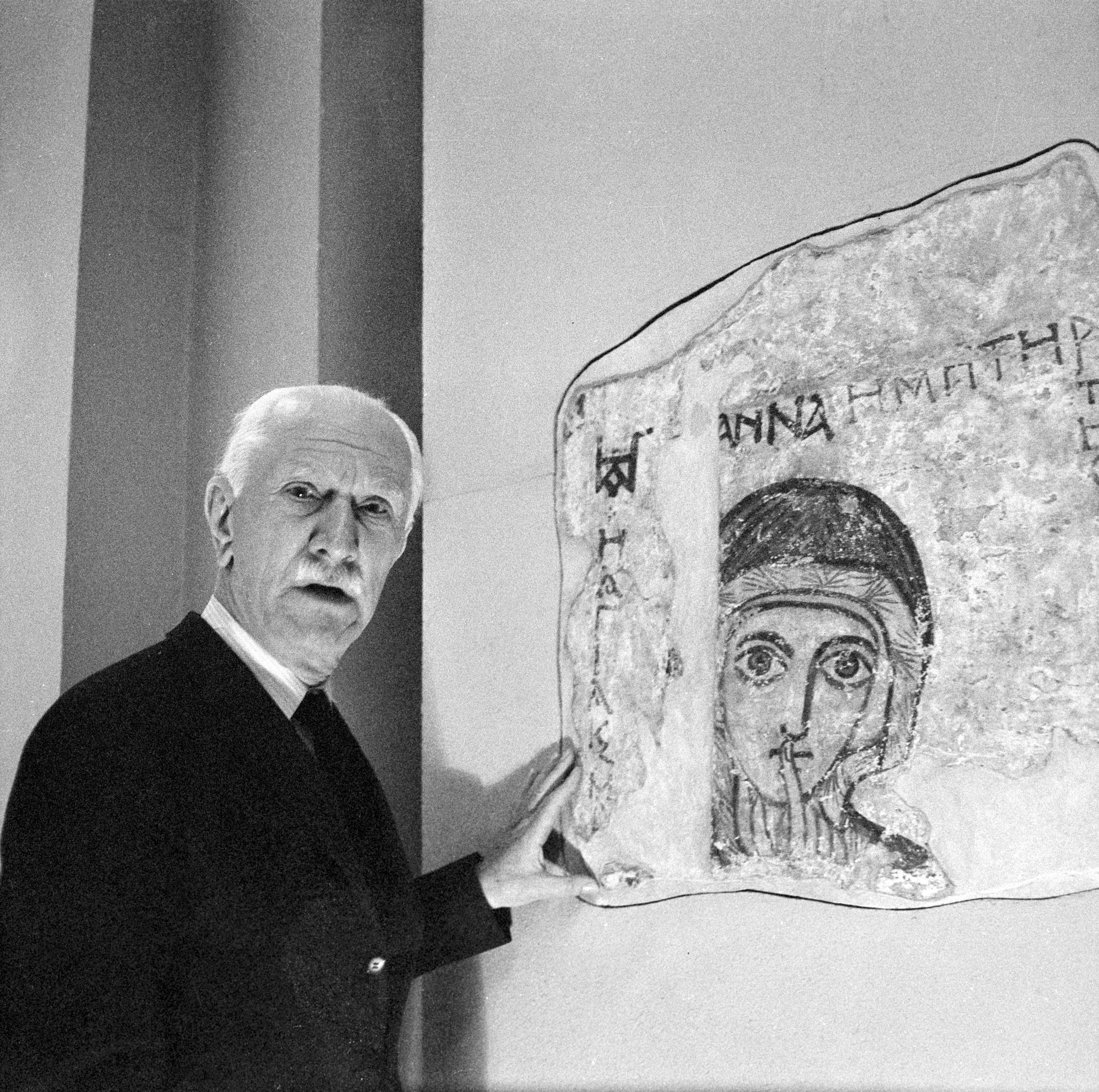
Michałowski

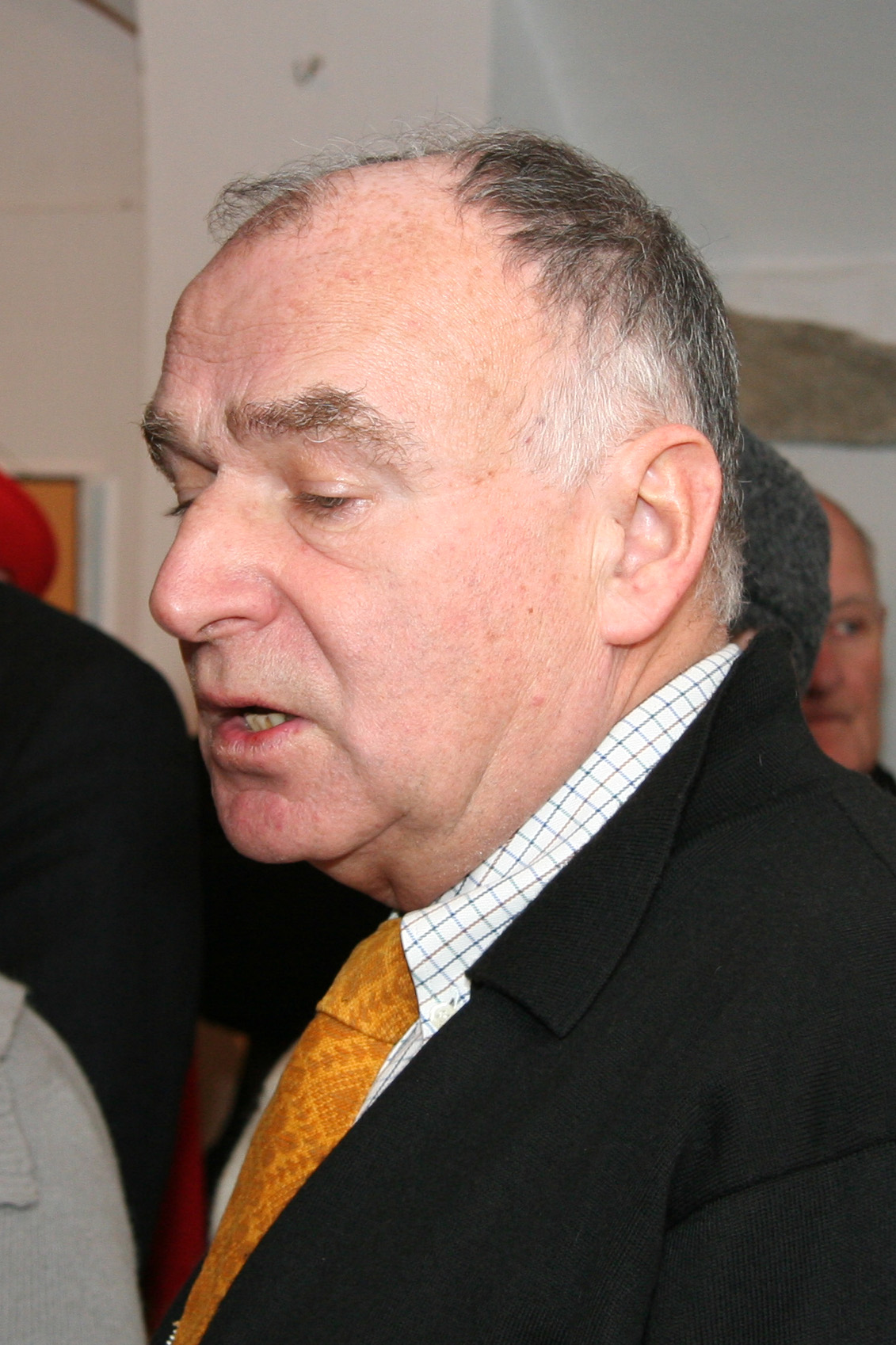
Myśliwiec

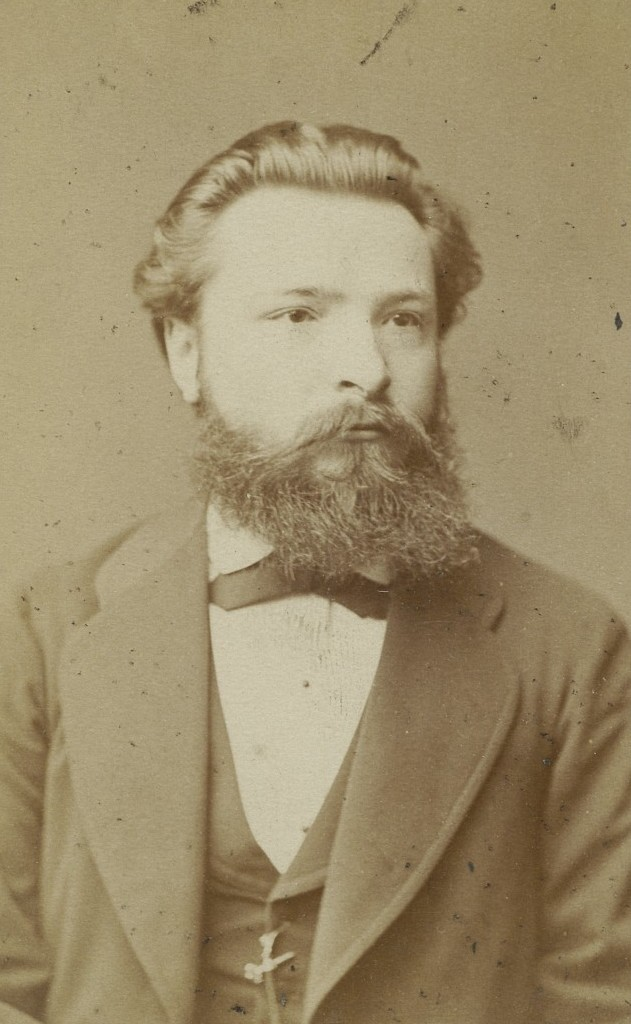
Ochorowicz

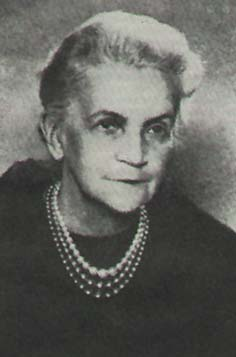
Ossowska

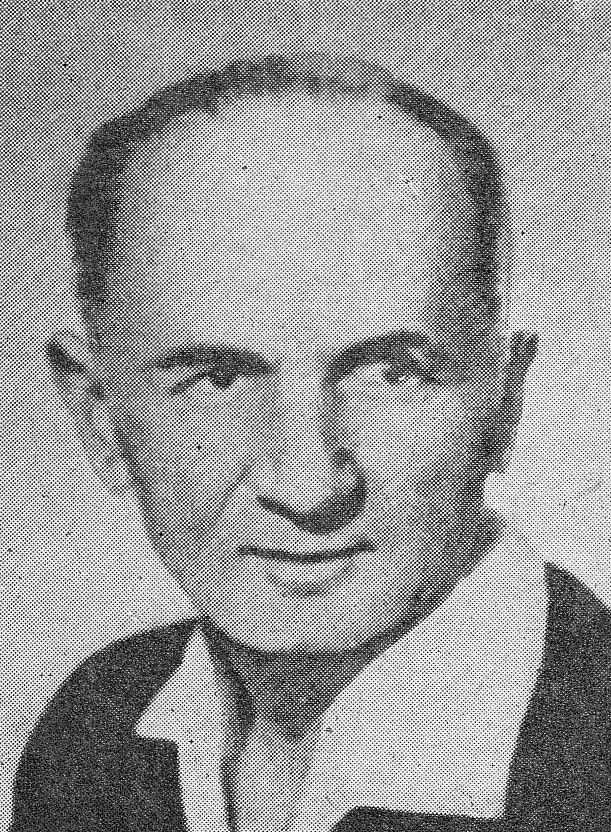
Ossowski

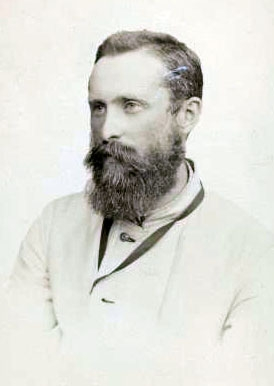
Piłsudski

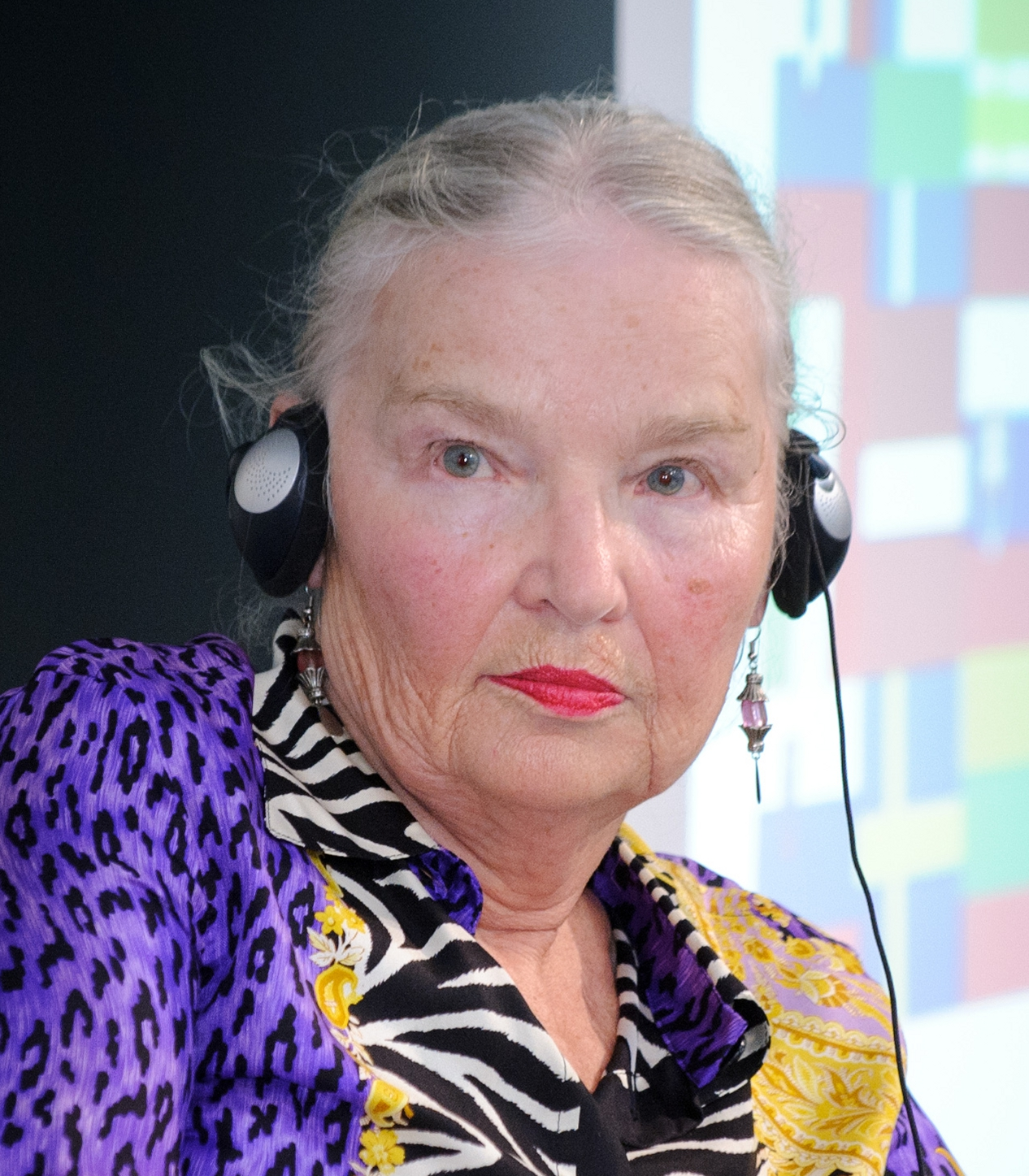
Staniszkis

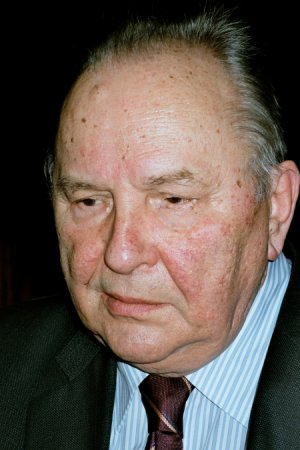
Szacki

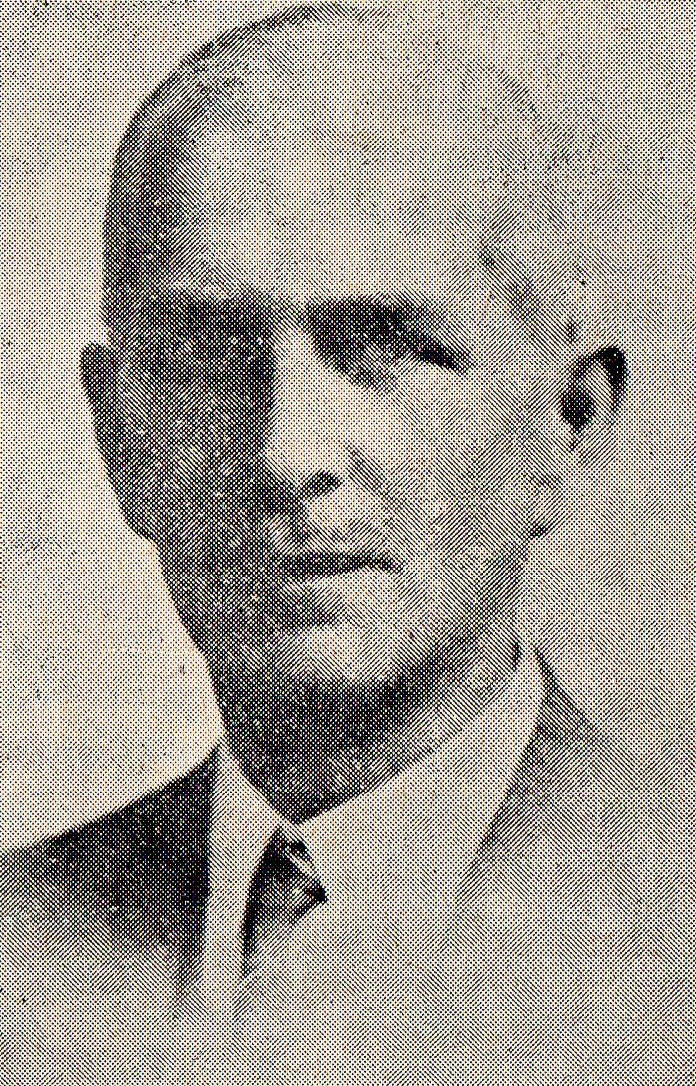
Znaniecki

== Economics ==
- Karol Adamiecki
- Leszek Balcerowicz
- Czesław Bobrowski
- Henryka Bochniarz
- Joanna Cygler
- Gabriel Czechowicz
- Franciszek Ksawery Drucki-Lubecki
- Zyta Gilowska
- Adam Glapiński
- Władysław Grabski
- Henryk Grossman
- Robert Gwiazdowski
- Leonid Hurwicz, 2007 Nobel Laureate
- Danuta Hübner
- Michał Kalecki
- Grzegorz Kołodko
- Monika Kostera
- Tadeusz Kowalik
- Stanisław Kronenberg
- Eugeniusz Kwiatkowski
- Ludwik Maurycy Landau
- Oskar Lange
- Janusz Lewandowski
- Edward Lipiński
- Kazimierz Łaski
- Grzegorz Marek Michalski
- Wacław Micuta
- Hilary Minc
- Marek Rocki
- Dariusz Rosati
- Jacek Rostowski
- Adam Rudawski
- Agata Sobczyk
- Edward Szczepanik
- Sławomir Szwedowski
- Louis Wolowski
- Halina Wasilewska-Trenkner
- Antoni Żabko-Potopowicz
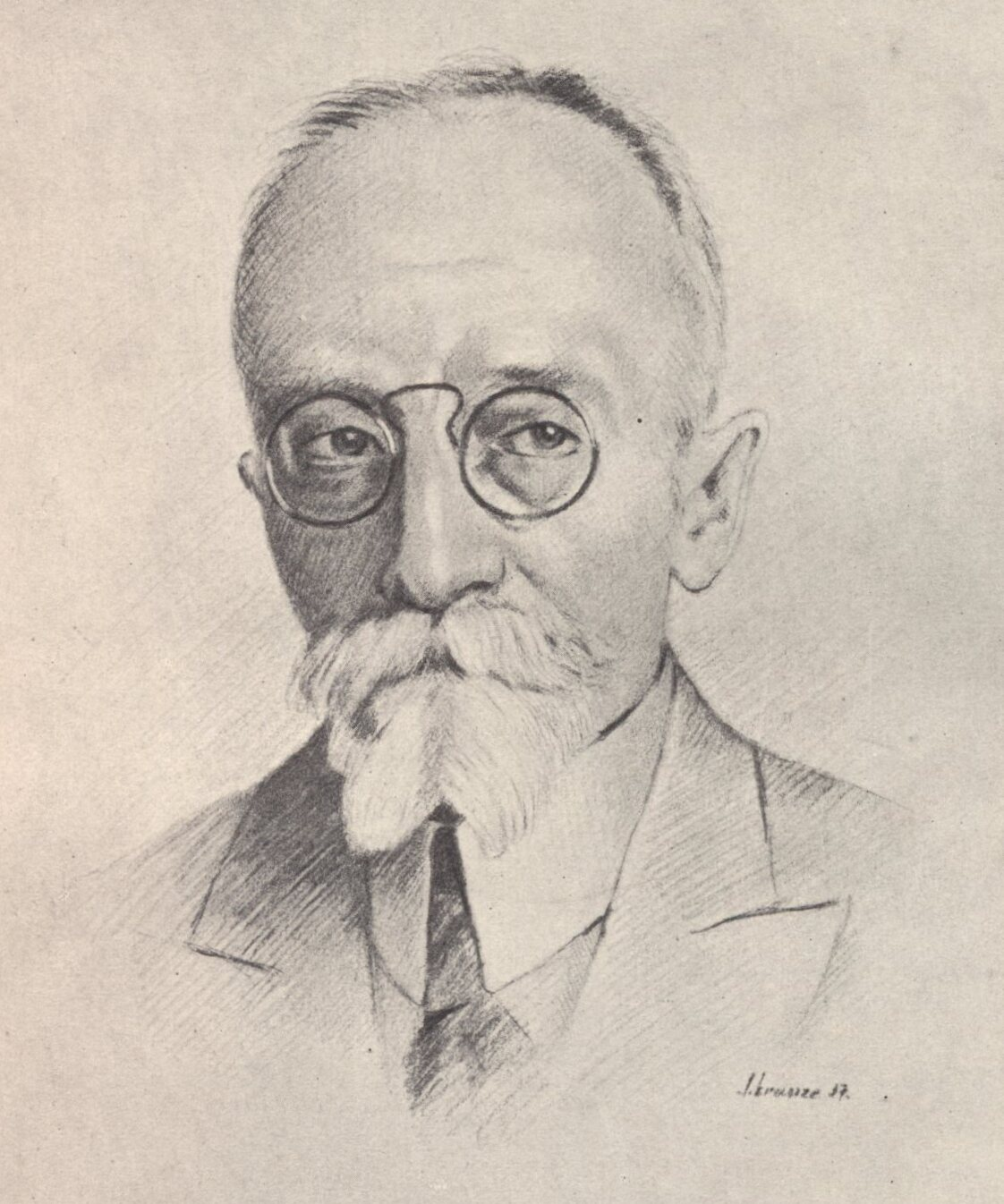
Adamiecki

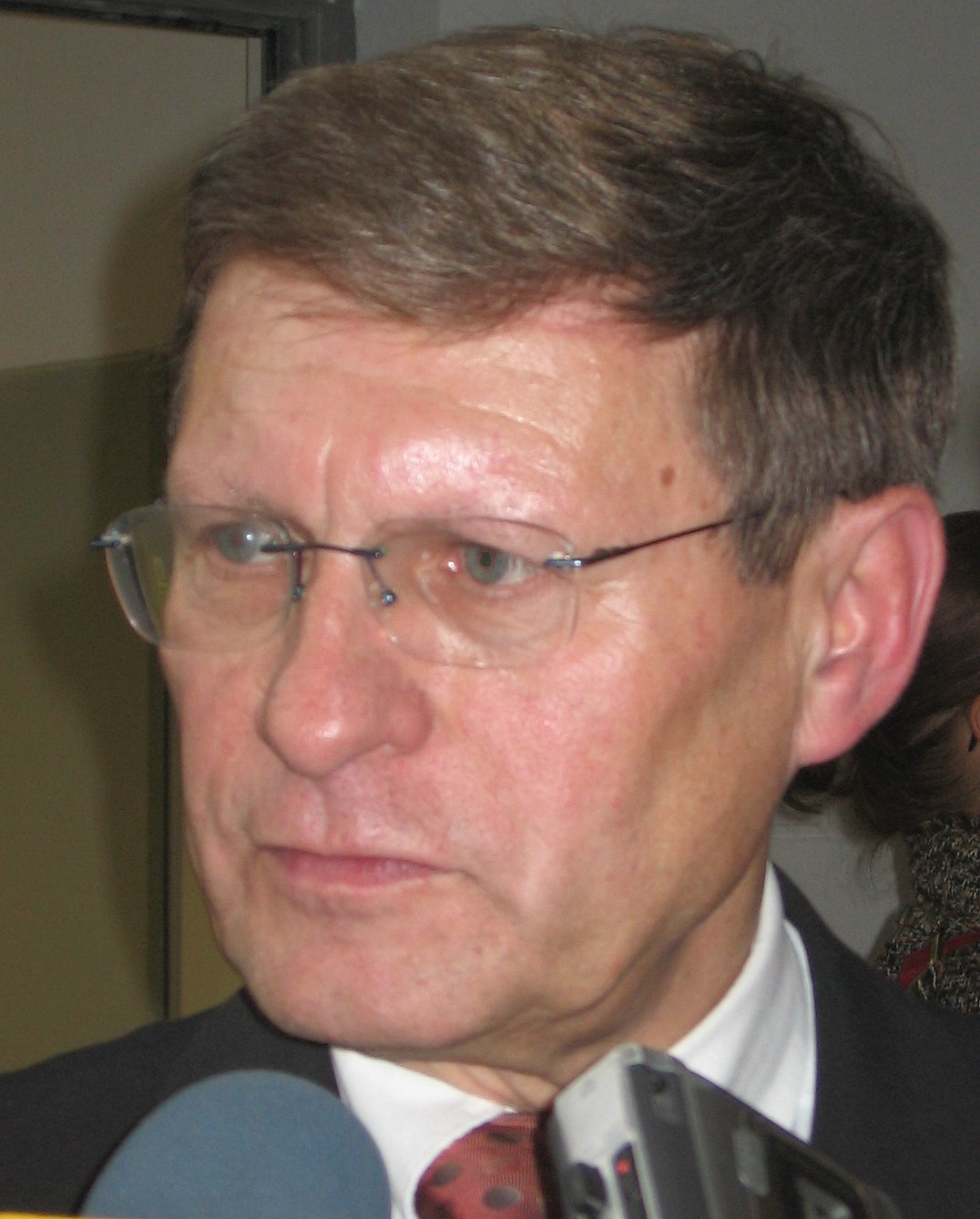
Balcerowicz

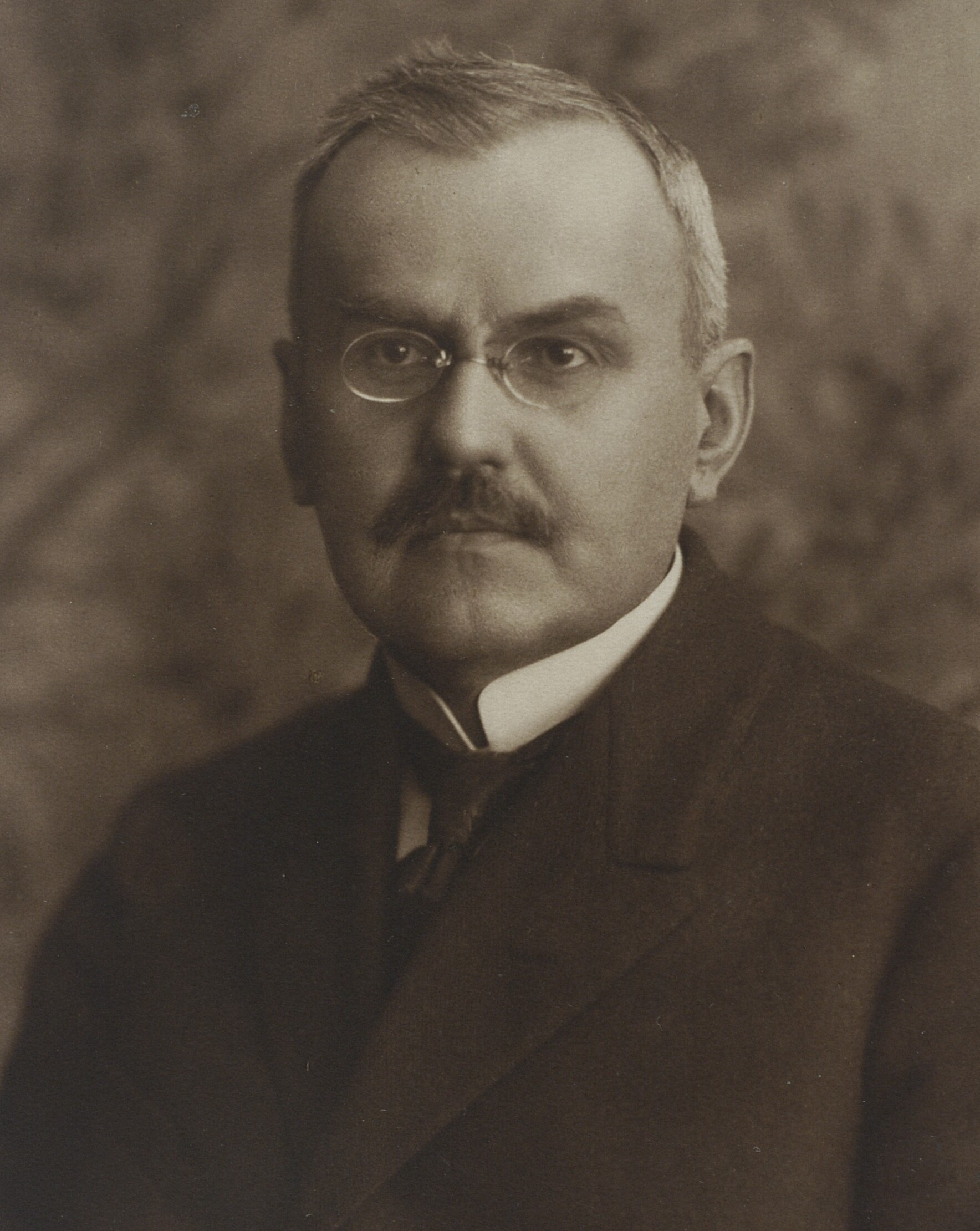
Grabski

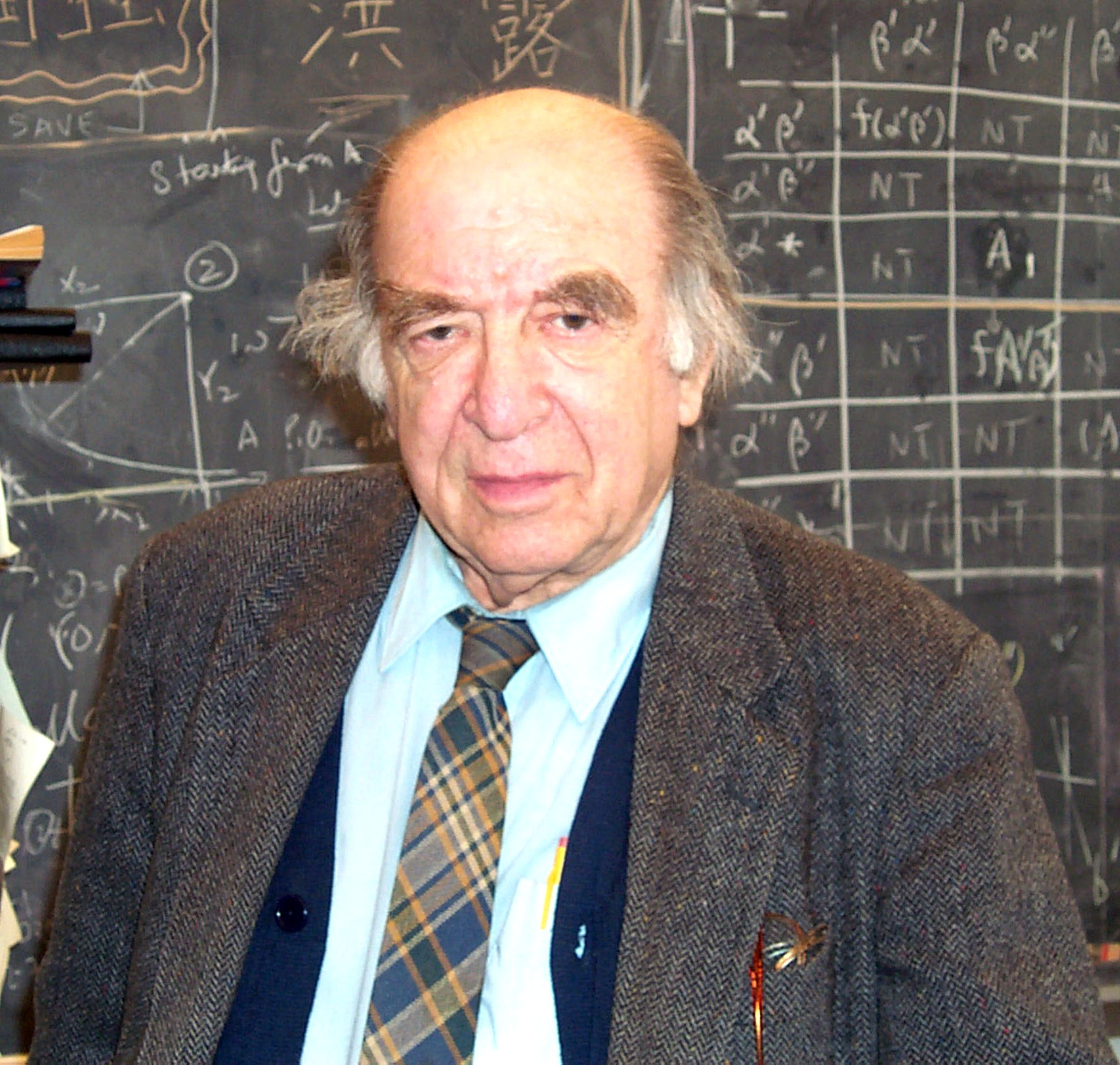
Hurwicz

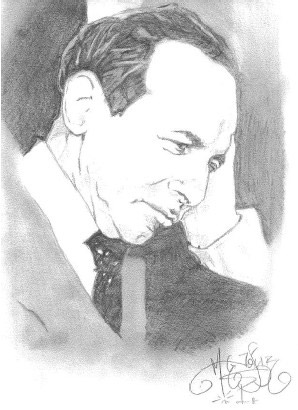
Kalecki

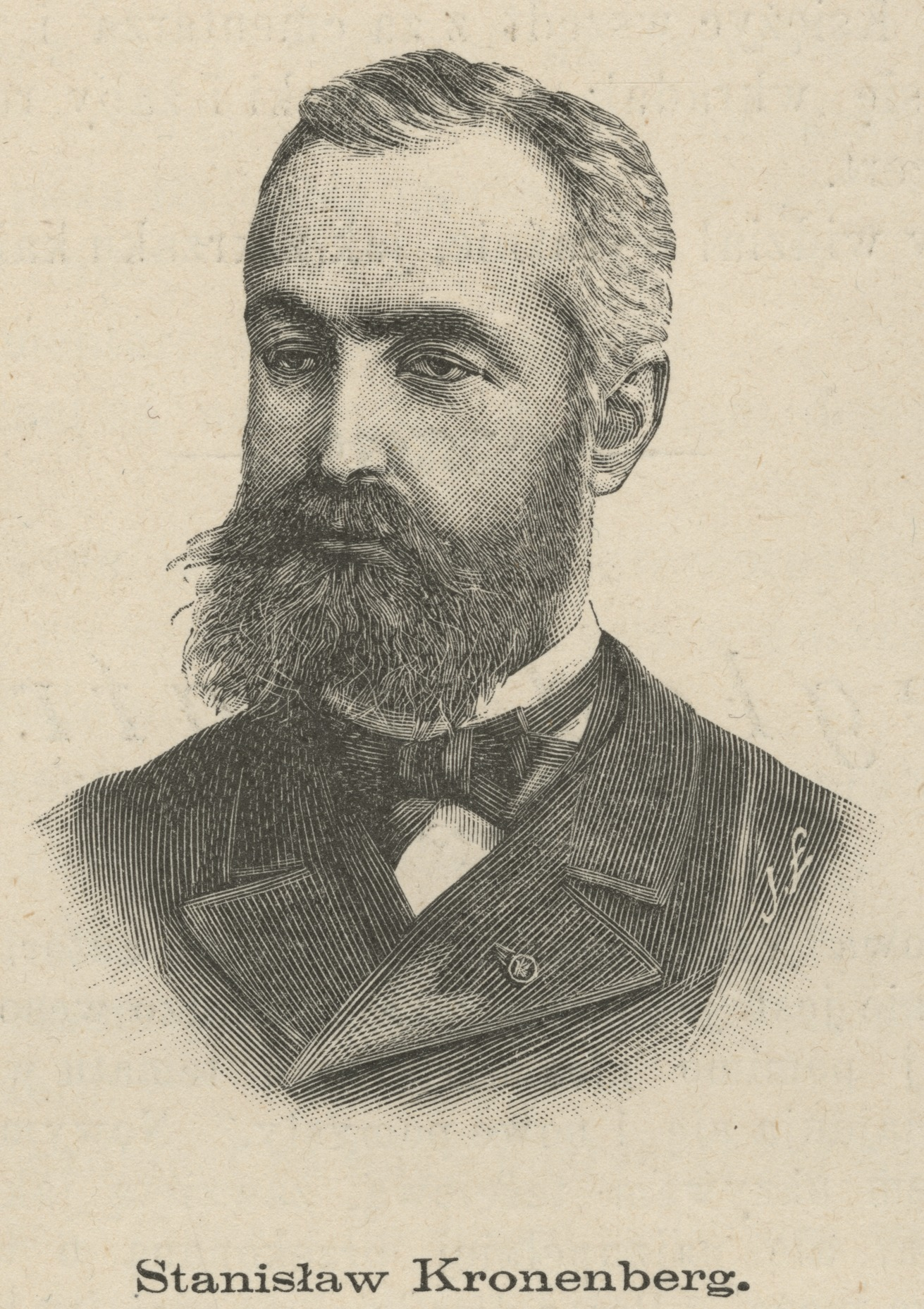
Kronenberg

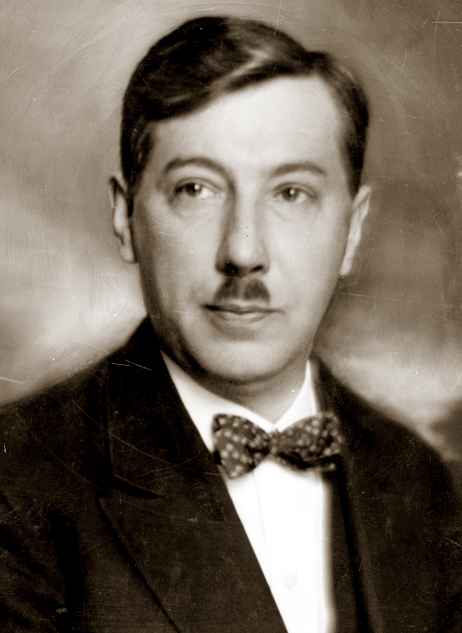
Kwiatkowski

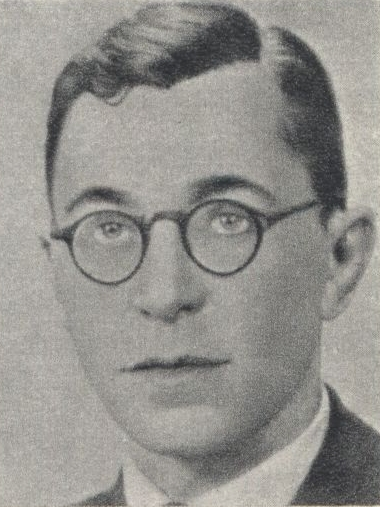
Landau

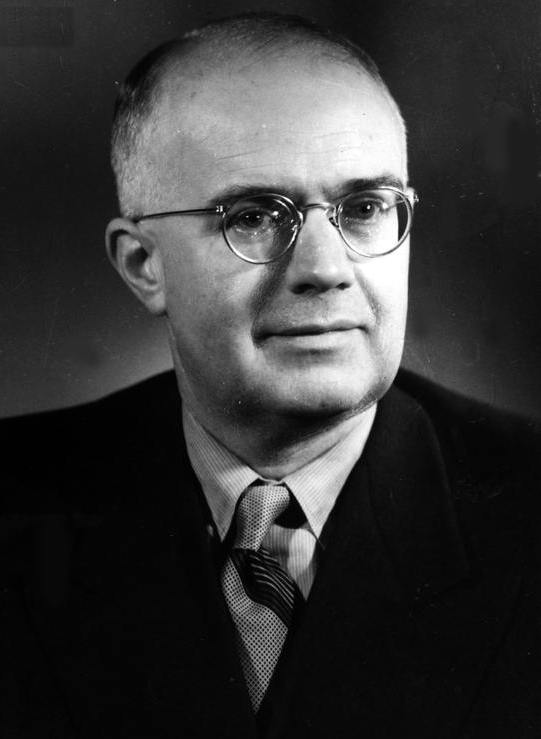
Lange

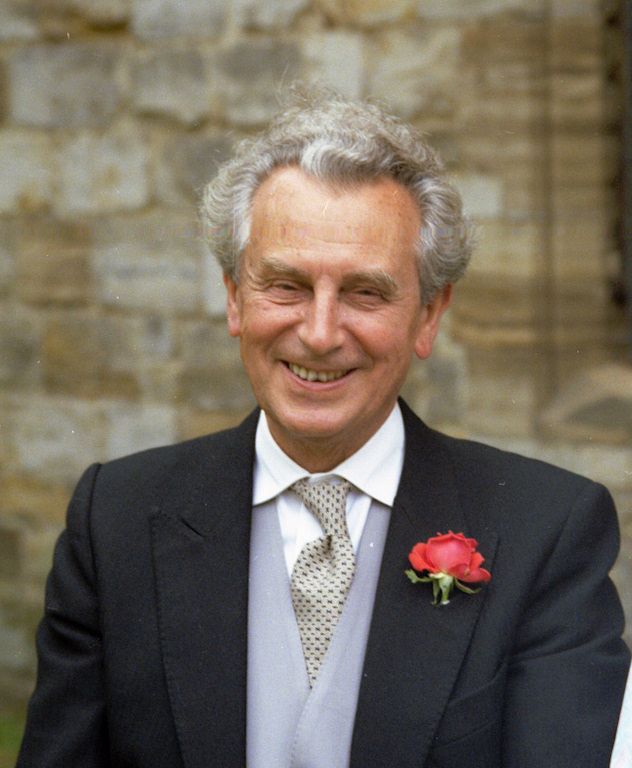
Szczepanik

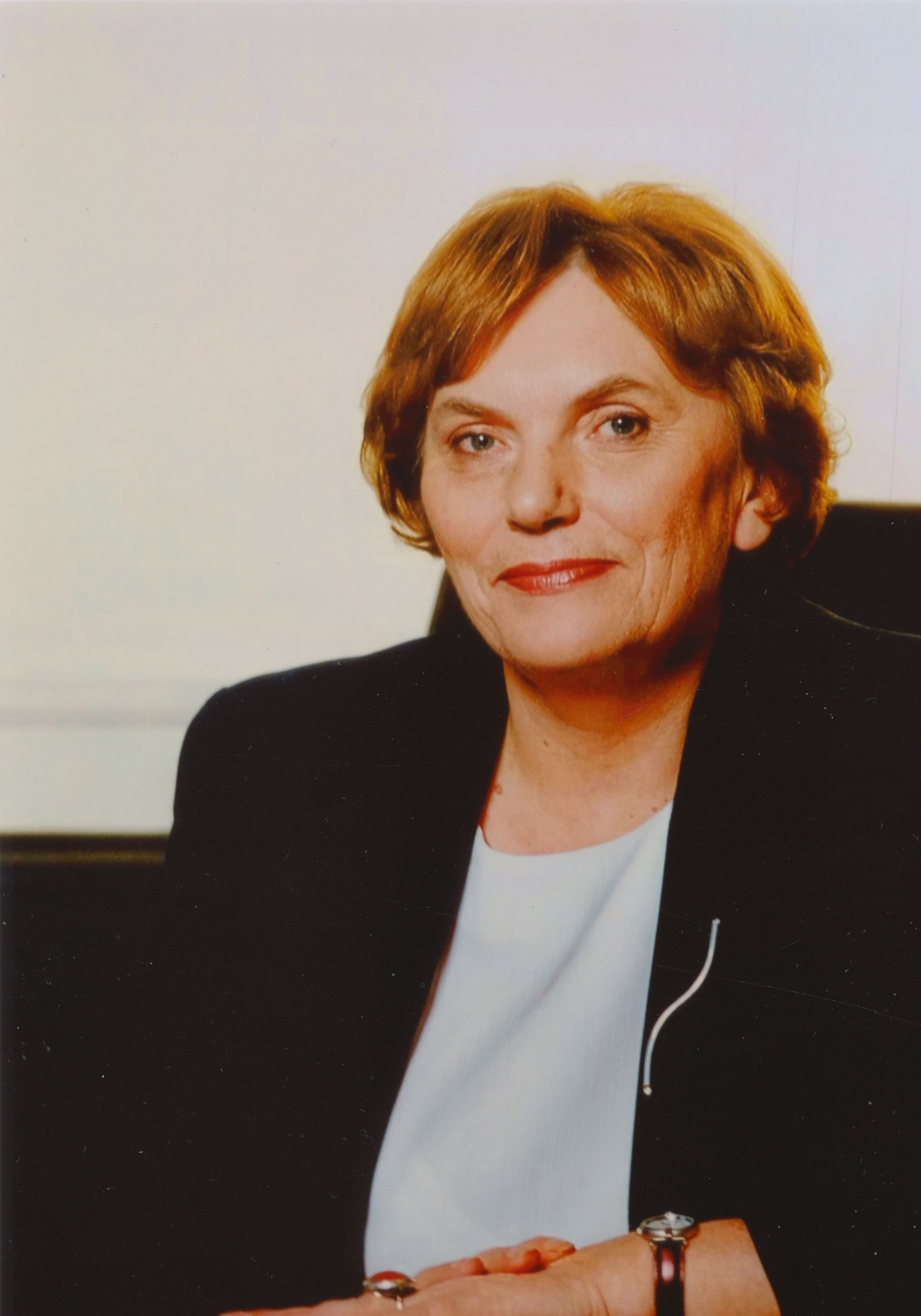
Wasilewska-Trenkner

== Other sciences ==
- Henryk Arctowski (1871–1958), geophysicist, meteorologist, Antarctic explorer
- Leon Barszczewski, explorer
- Piotr Ignacy Bieńkowski, scholar, archaeologist, professor
- Karol Bohdanowicz, geologist
- Aleksander Czekanowski, explorer of Siberia
- Jan Czerski, paleontologist, explorer of Siberia
- Zofia Daszyńska-Golińska, socialist politician, suffragist
- Helene Deutsch, psychoanalyst
- Antoni Bolesław Dobrowolski, geophysicist, meteorologist, polar explorer
- Ignacy Domeyko, geologist
- Benedykt Dybowski, naturalist, explorer of Siberia
- Gaspar da Gama, traveller, interpreter, explorer
- Bronisław Grąbczewski, explorer
- Mirosław Hermaszewski, the first Polish cosmonaut
- Leonard Jaczewski, engineer, explorer of Asian Russia
- Maria Janion, critic and theoretician of literature, feminist
- Henryk Jordan, founding father of physical education
- Józefa Joteyko, physiologist, psychologist and pedagogue
- Antoni Kępiński, psychiatrist
- Agnieszka Kłopotek, zootechnician, politician
- Janusz Korczak, pedagogue, writer
- Irena Krzywicka, feminist, writer, translator
- Zofia Licharewa, geologist, museum founder
- Henryk Lipszyc, specialist in Japanese culture, translator, ambassador of Poland in Tokyo
- Rosa Luxemburg, Marxist political theorist, socialist philosopher, and revolutionary
- Józef Morozewicz, mineralogist, petrographer
- Halszka Osmólska, paleontologist
- Jacek Pałkiewicz, journalist and explorer, best known for discovering the sources of the Amazon River
- Danuta Ptaszycka-Jackowska (1939–2025), geographer, landscape architect and educator
- Michael Alfred Peszke (1932–2015), psychiatrist, historian
- Benedykt Polak (Benedict the Pole, Benedictus Polonus), explorer
- Jan Potocki, linguist, Egyptologist, sociologist, author of The Saragossa Manuscript
- Eugeniusz Romer, cartographer
- Stanisław of Skarbimierz, political scientist
- Paweł Edmund Strzelecki (1797–1873), geologist, explorer of Australia
- Antoni Józef Śmieszek, Egyptologist
- Józef Trzemeski, polar explorer
- Aleksandra Uznańska-Wiśniewska, Polish–Thai politician, political scientist, humanitarian
- Bernard Wapowski, "father of Polish cartography"
- Andrzej Wawrzyniak (1931–2020), diplomat, founder of the Asia and Pacific Museum in Warsaw
- Paweł Włodkowic, jurist
- Czesław Zakaszewski, hydrologist
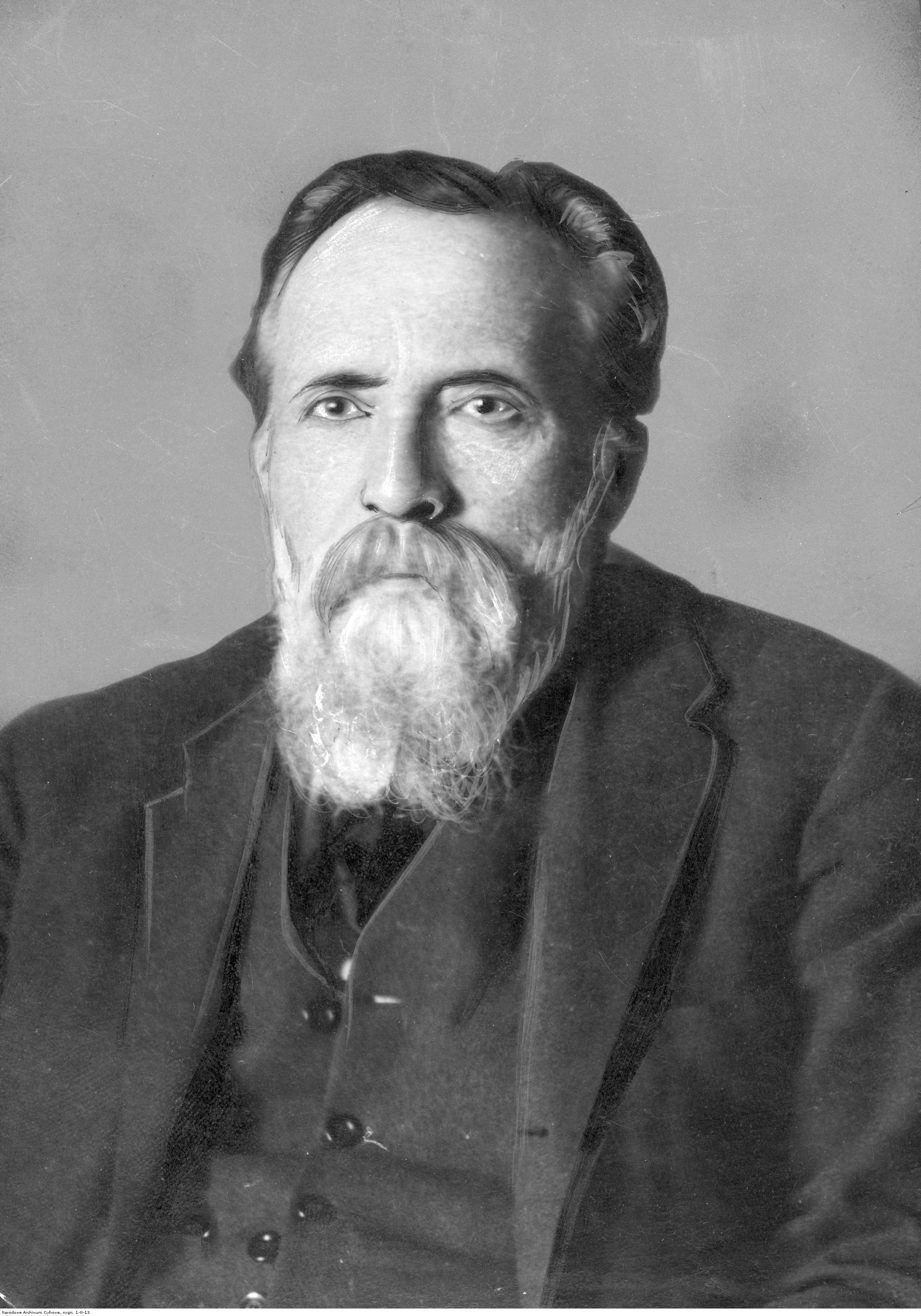
Arctowski

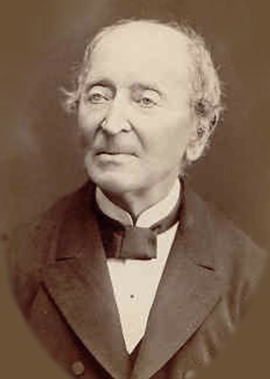
Domeyko

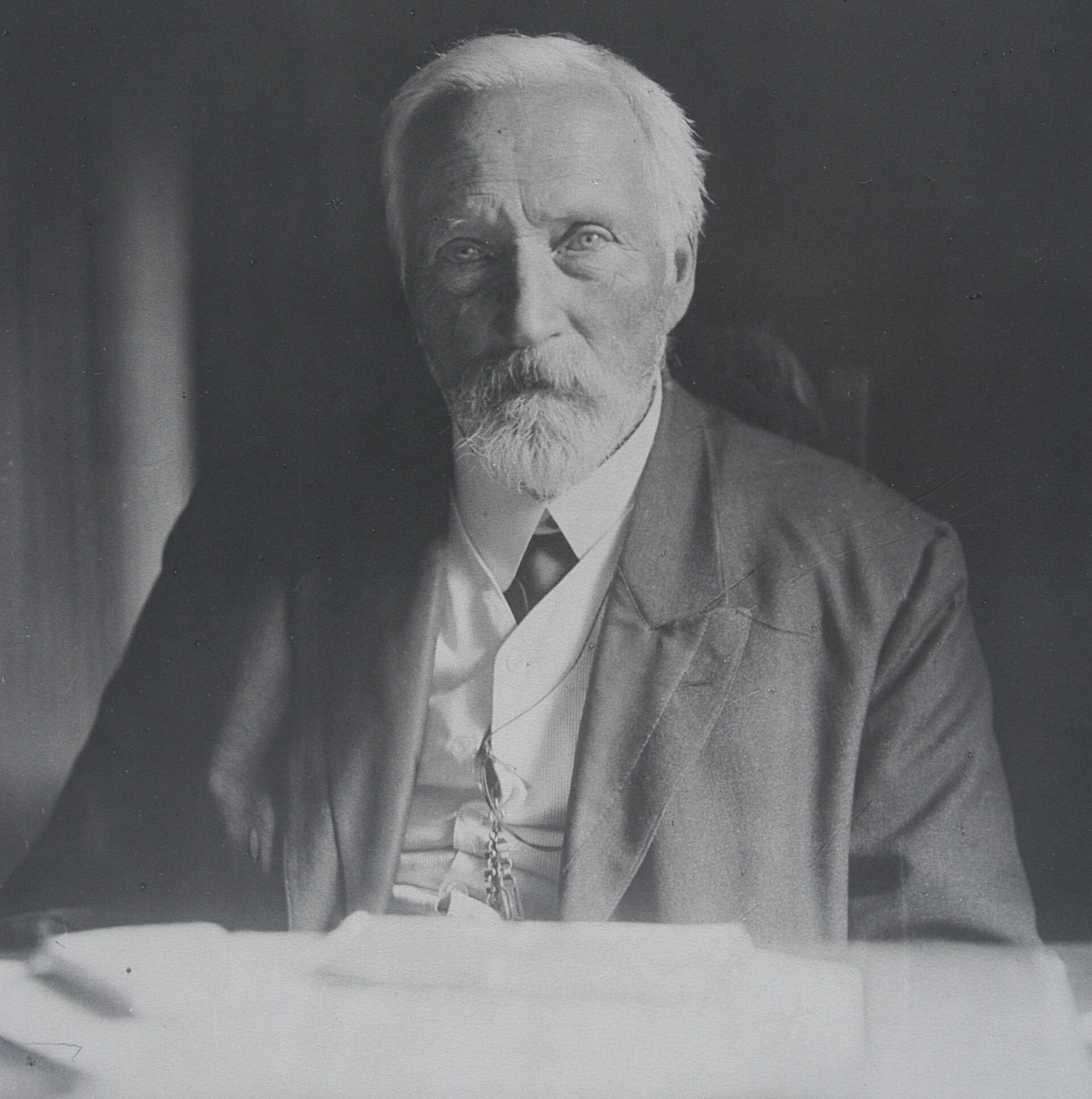
Dybowski

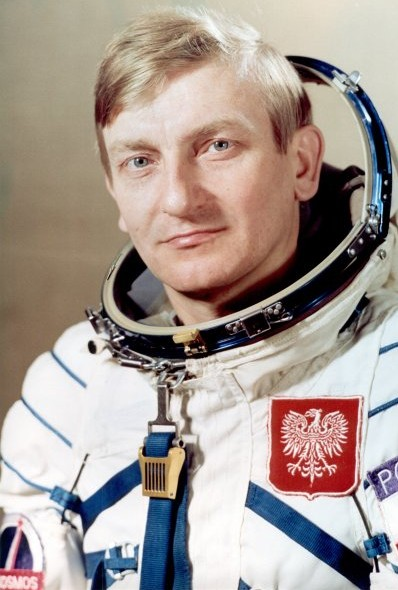
Hermaszewski

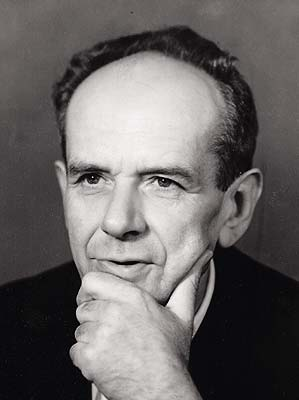
Kępiński

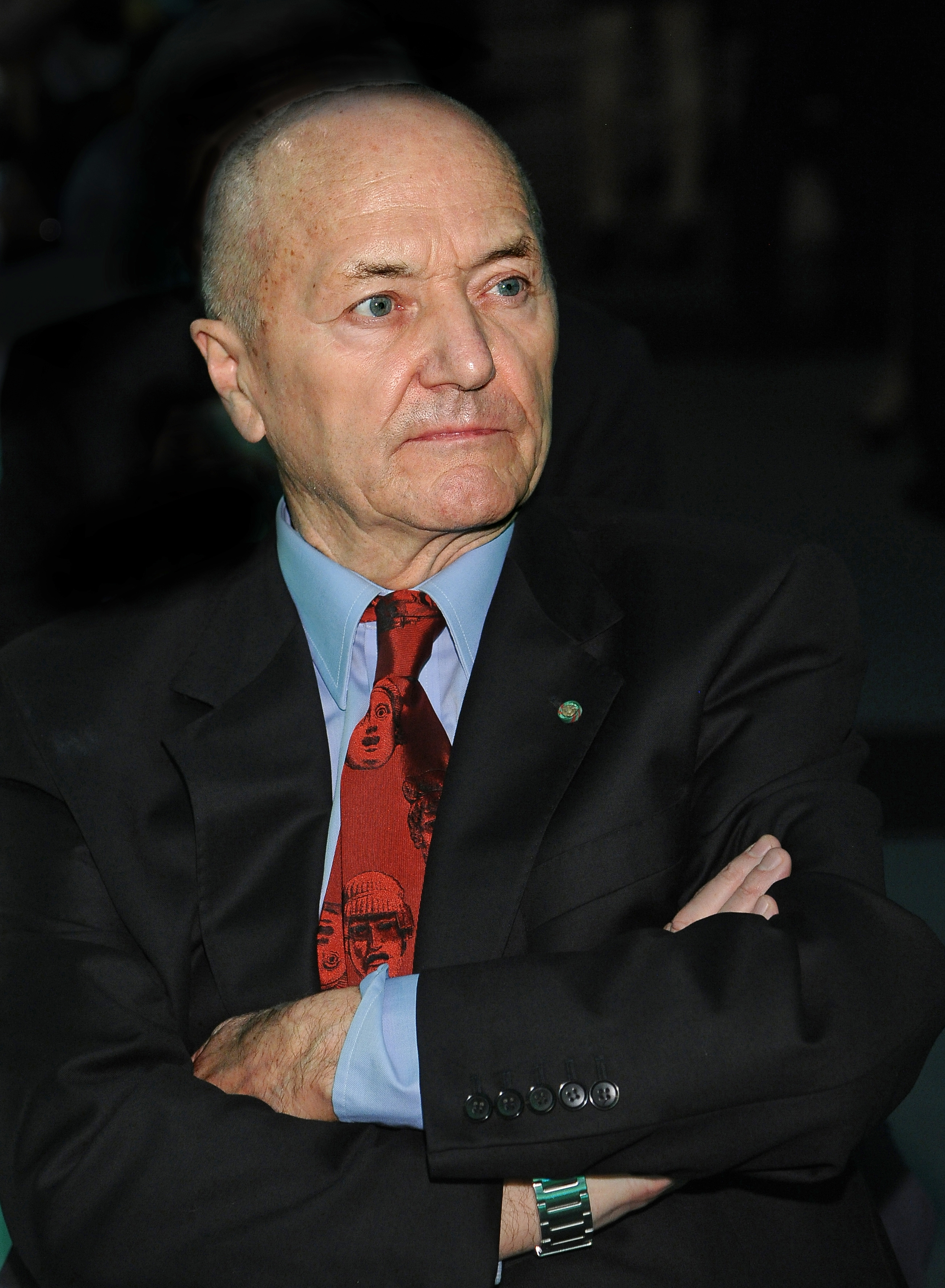
Pałkiewicz

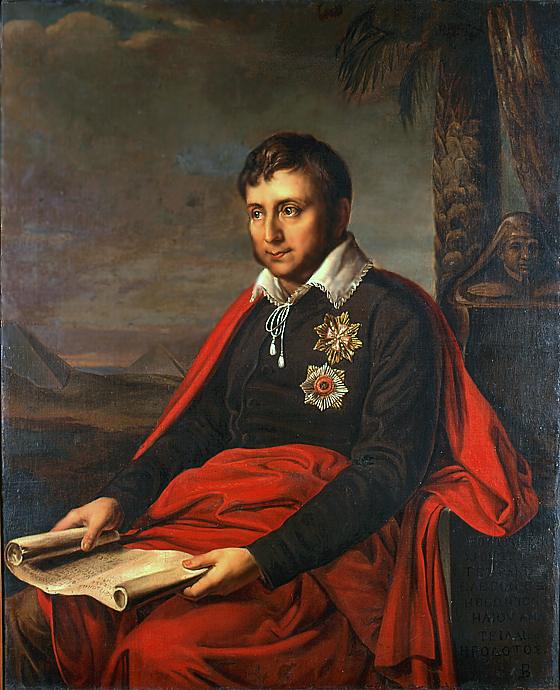
Potocki

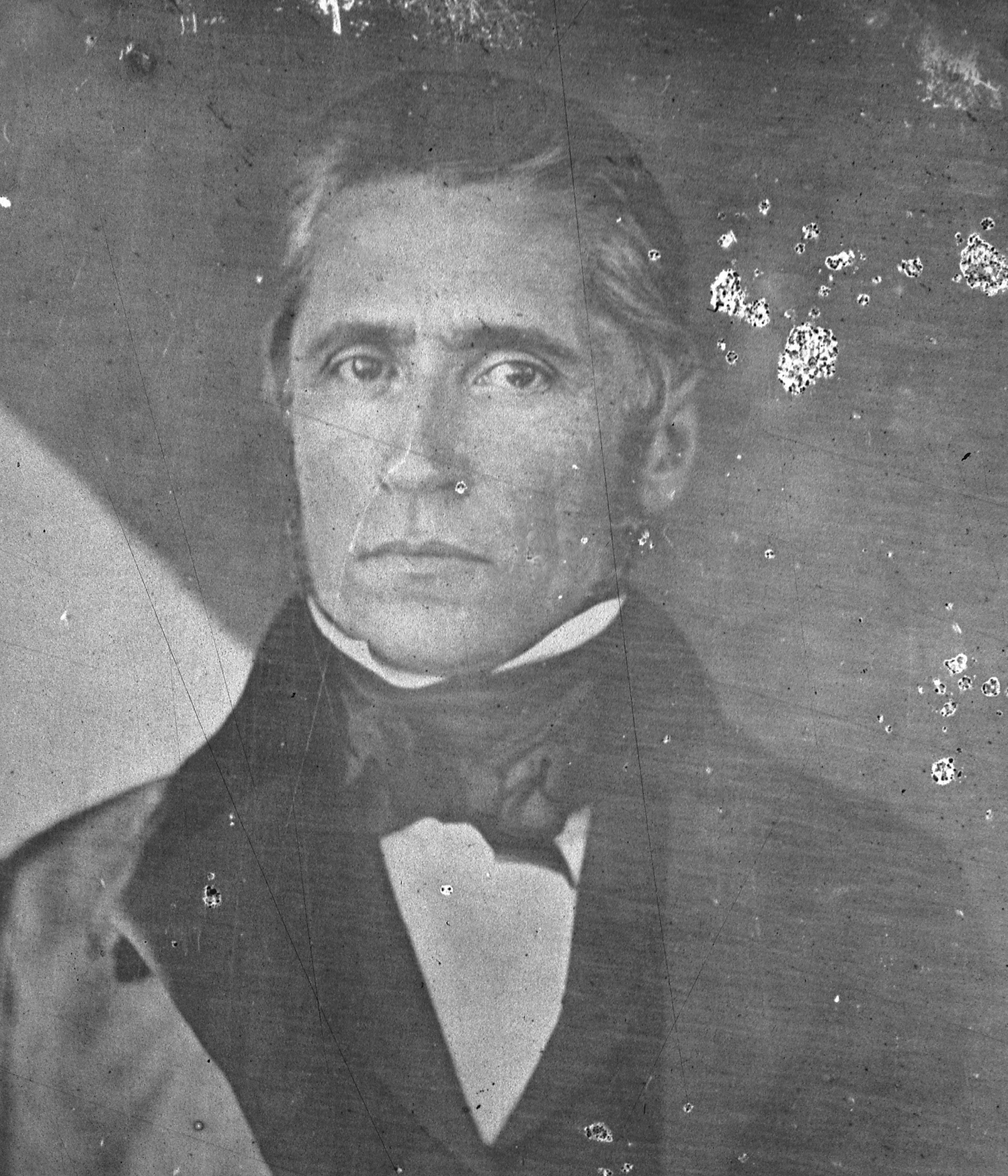
Strzelecki

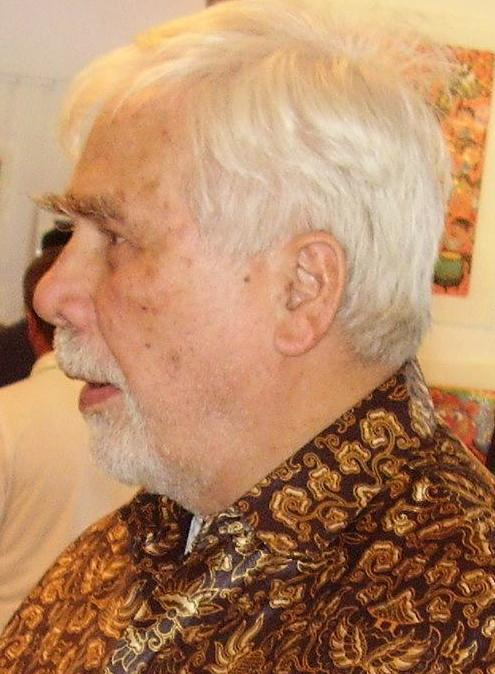
Wawrzyniak

== History ==
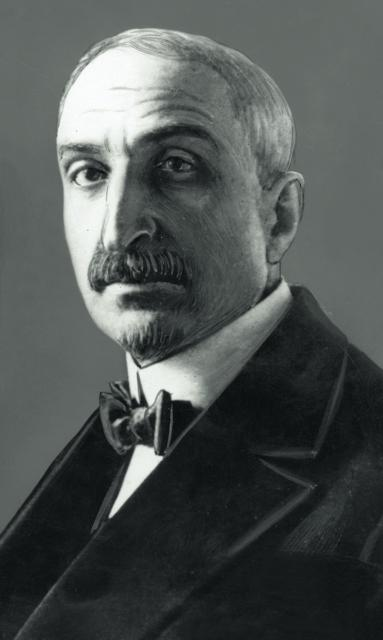
Askenazy

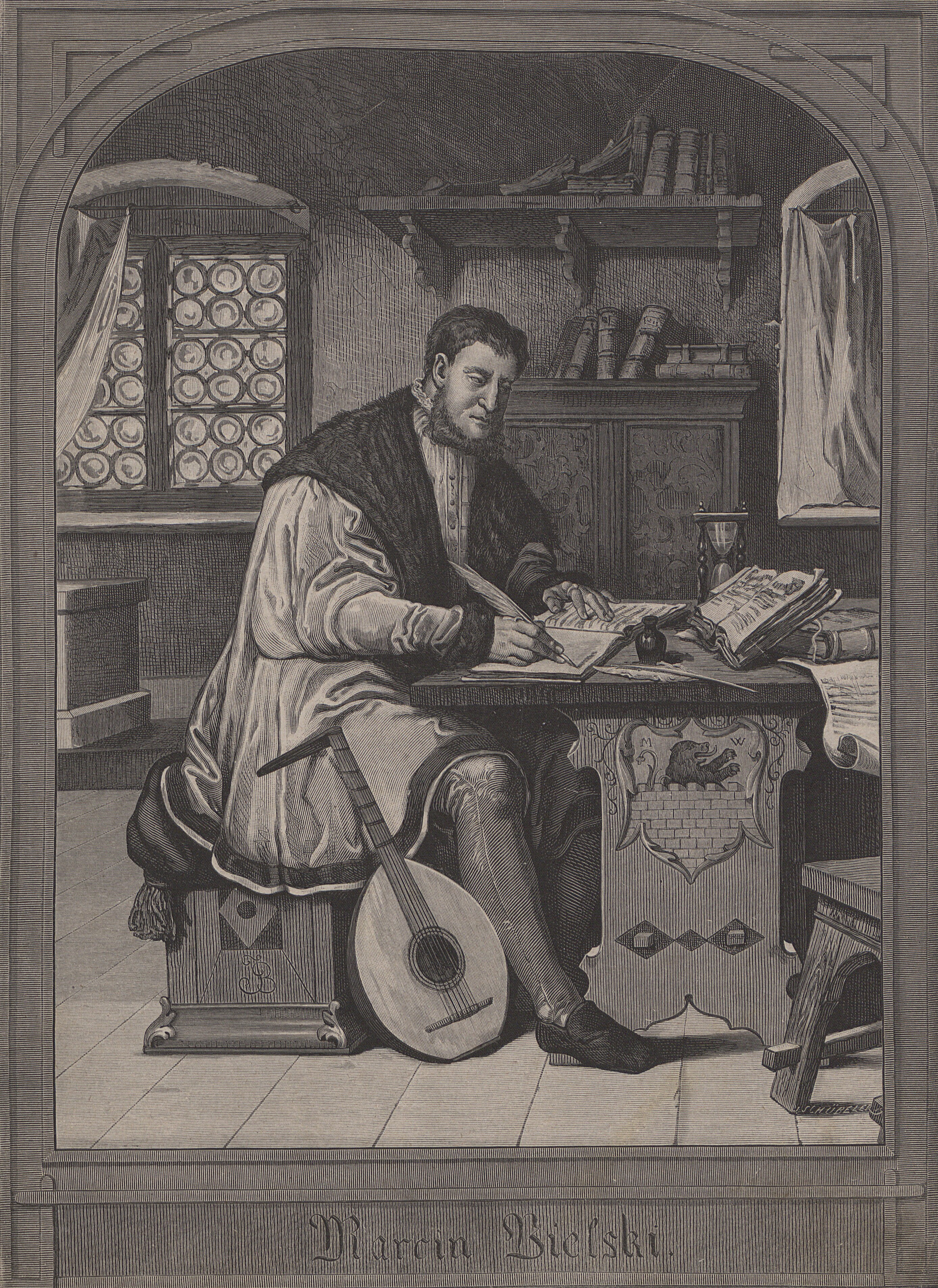
Bielski

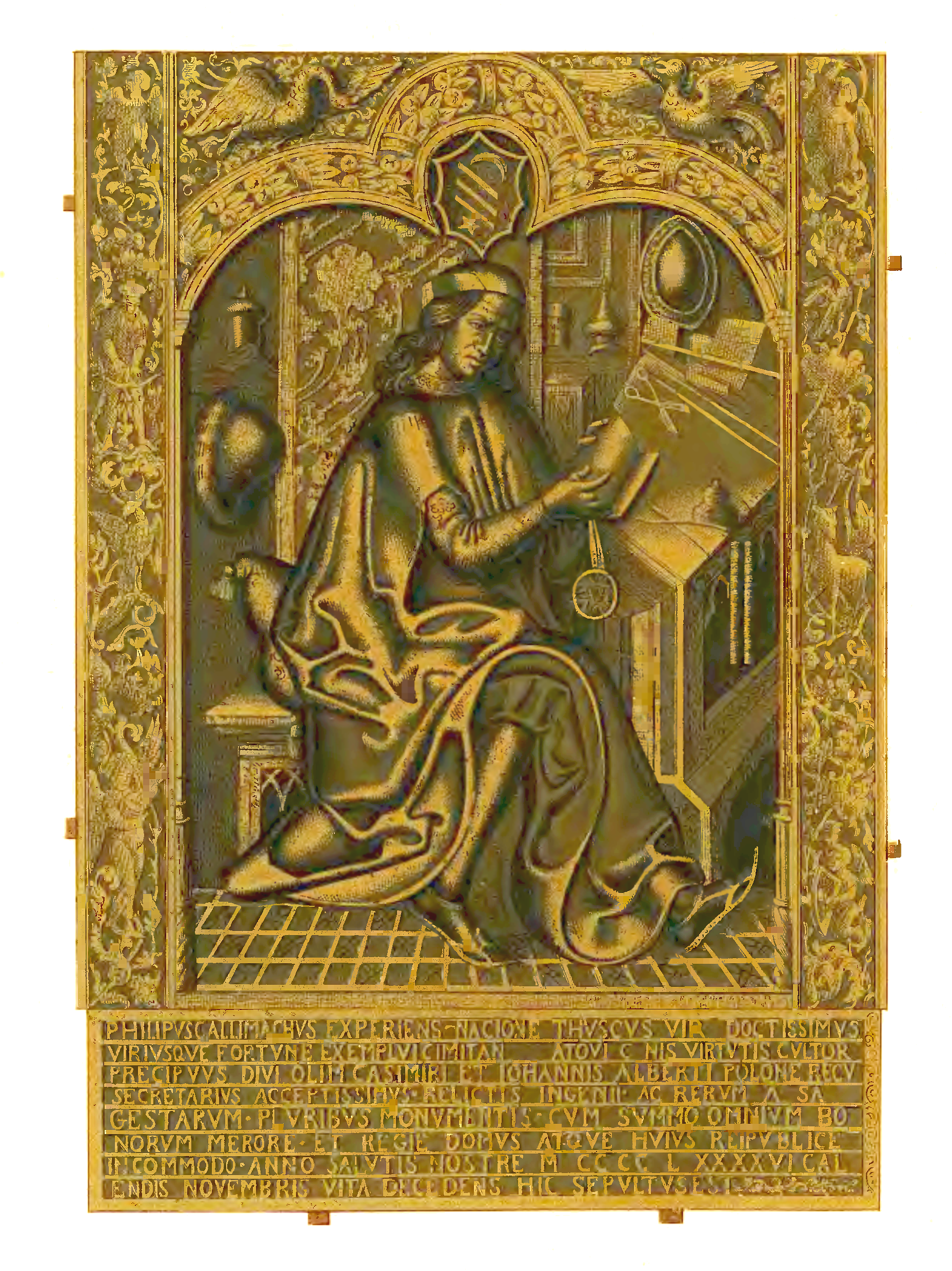
Callimachus

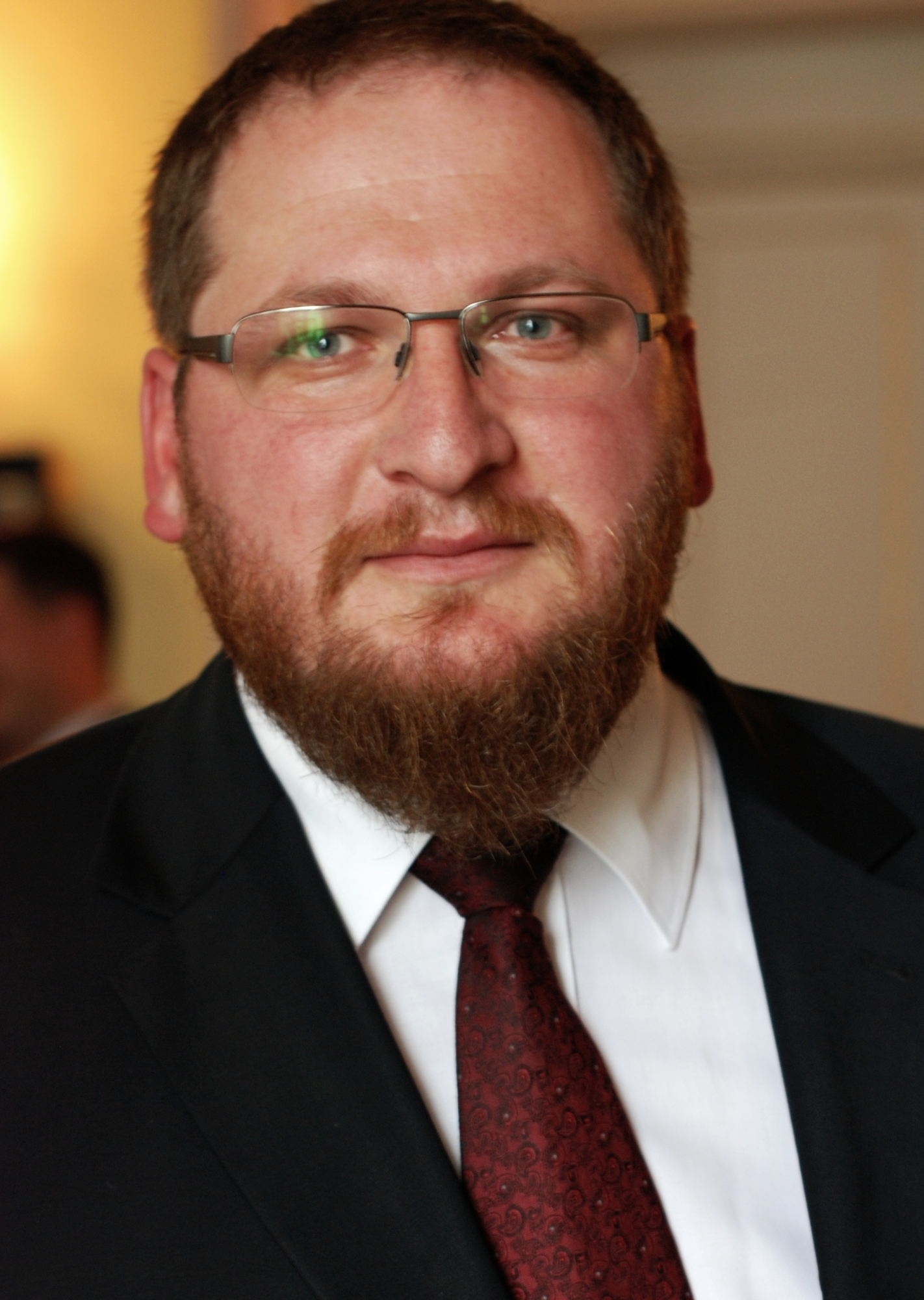
Cywiński

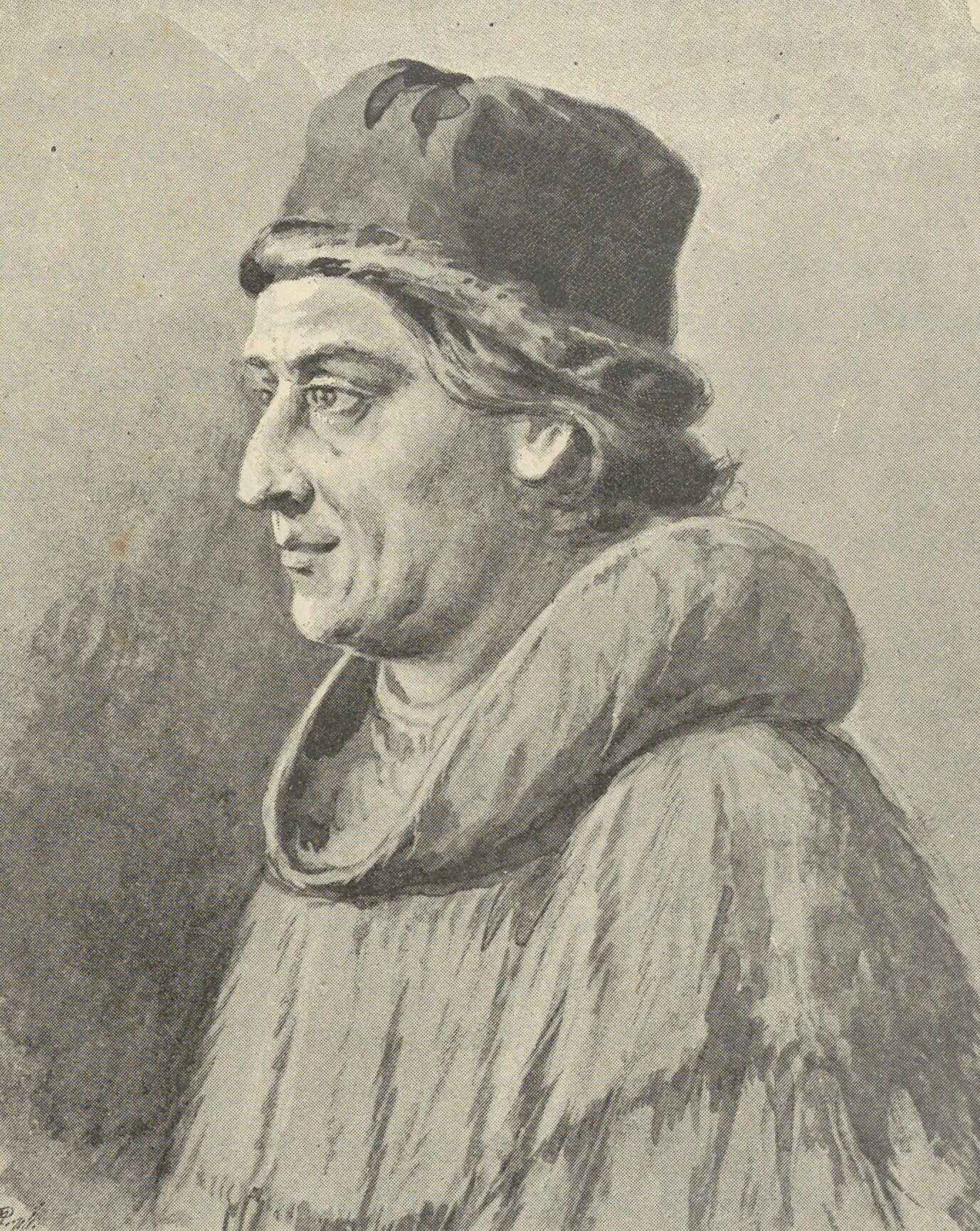
Długosz

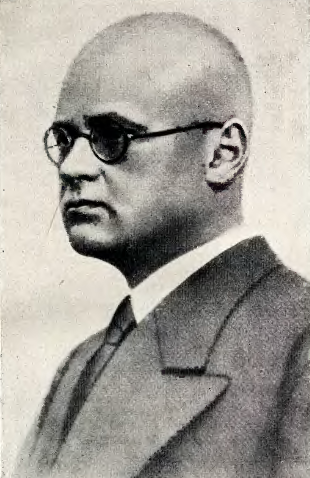
Feldman

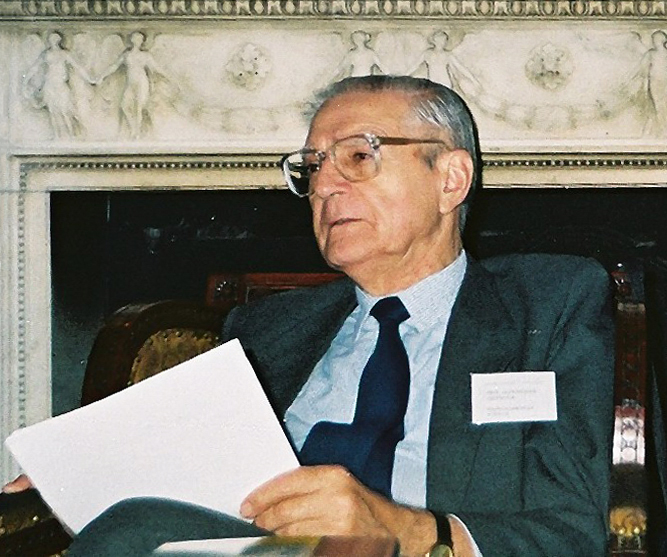
Gieysztor

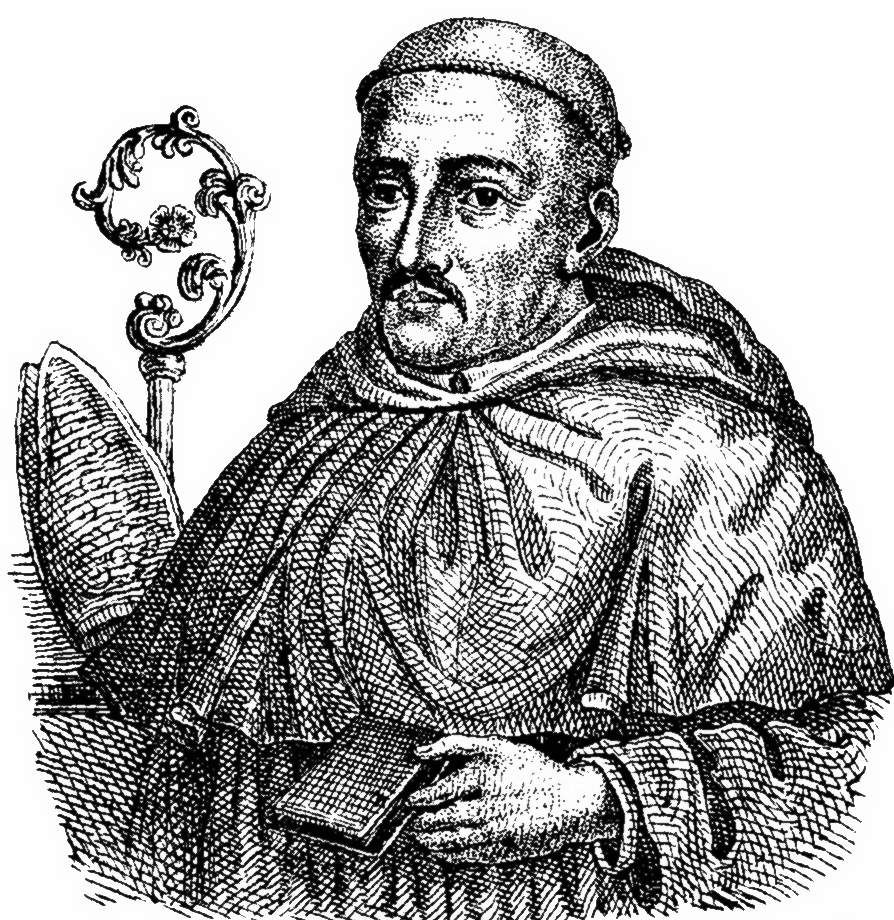
Kadłubek

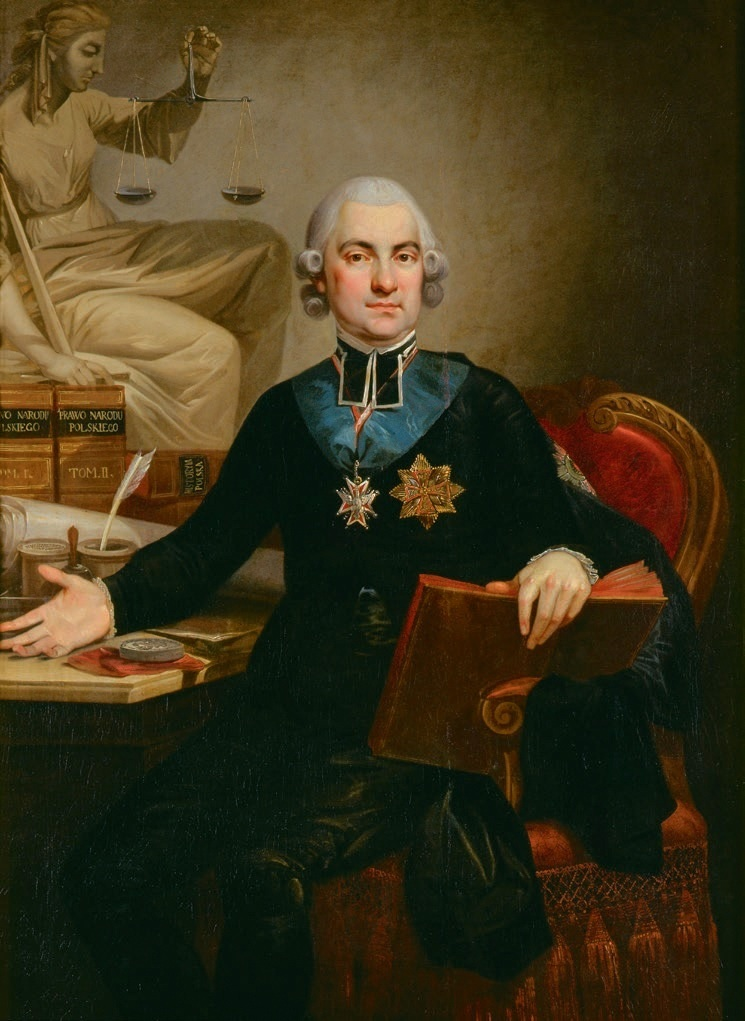
Kołłątaj

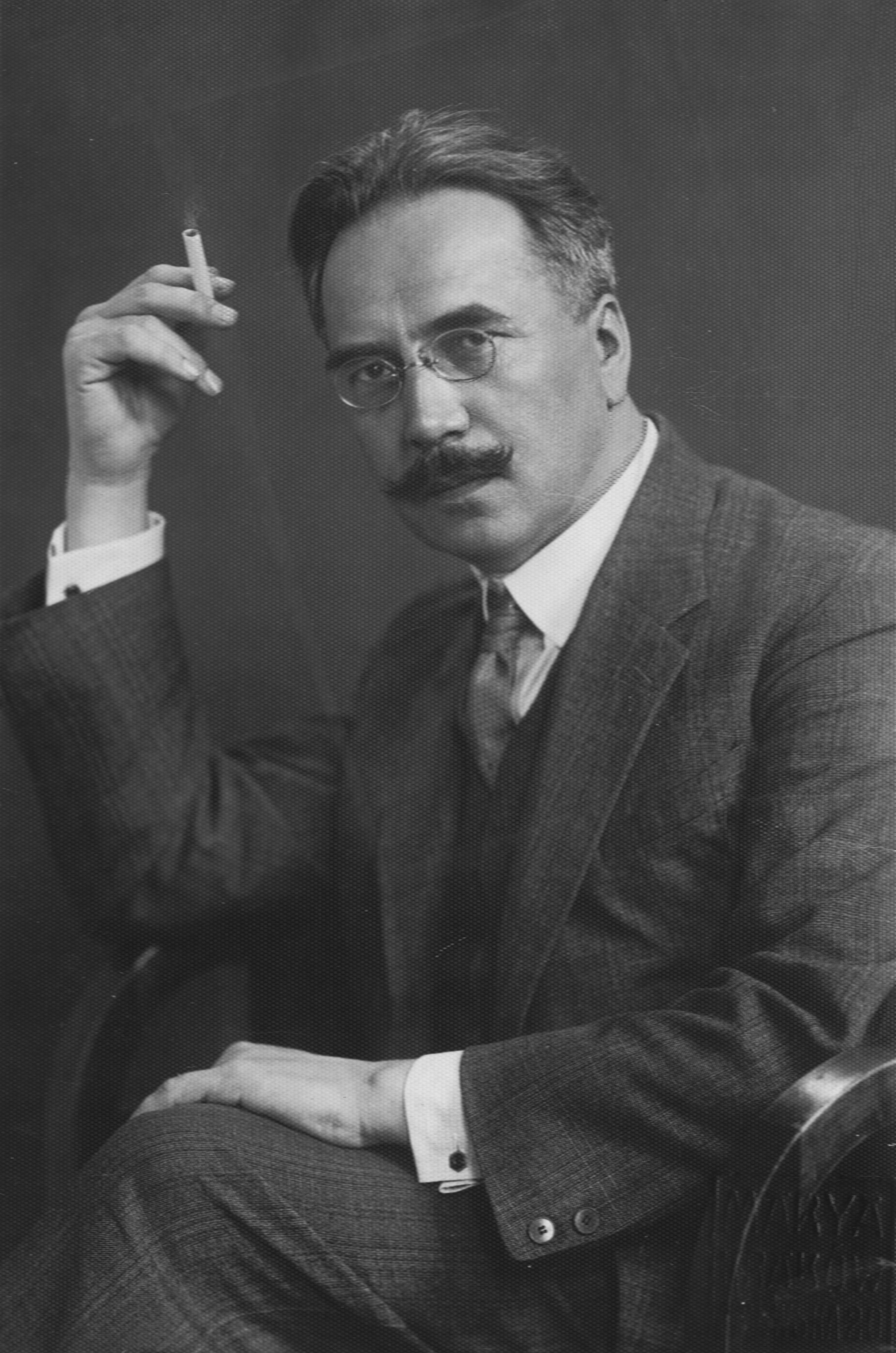
Kot

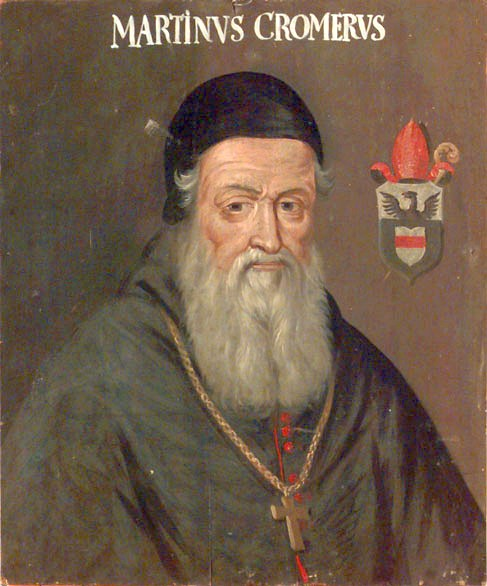
Kromer

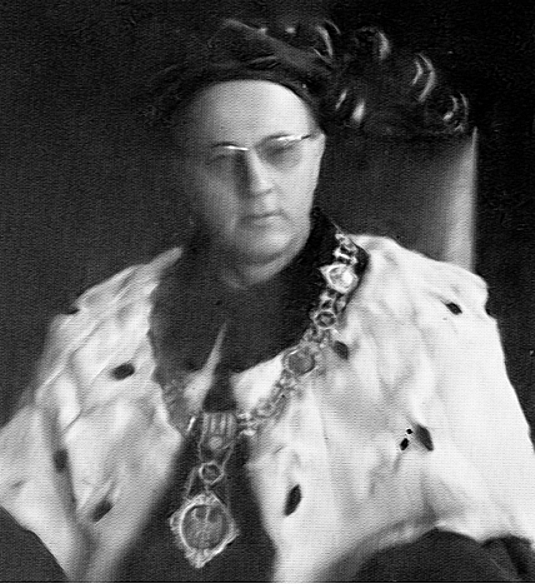
Labuda

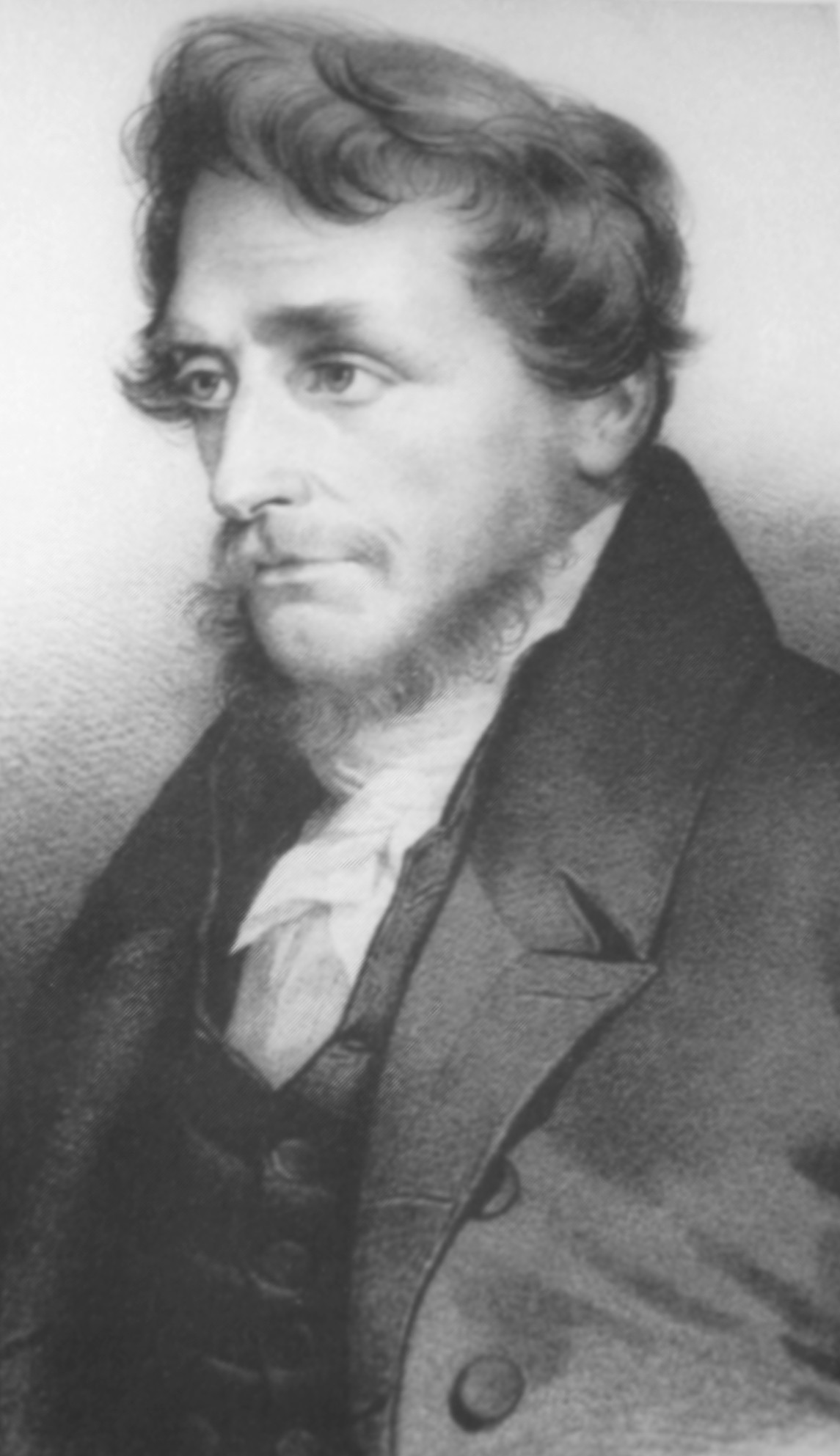
Lelewel

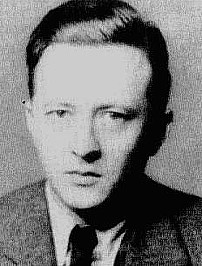
Lerski

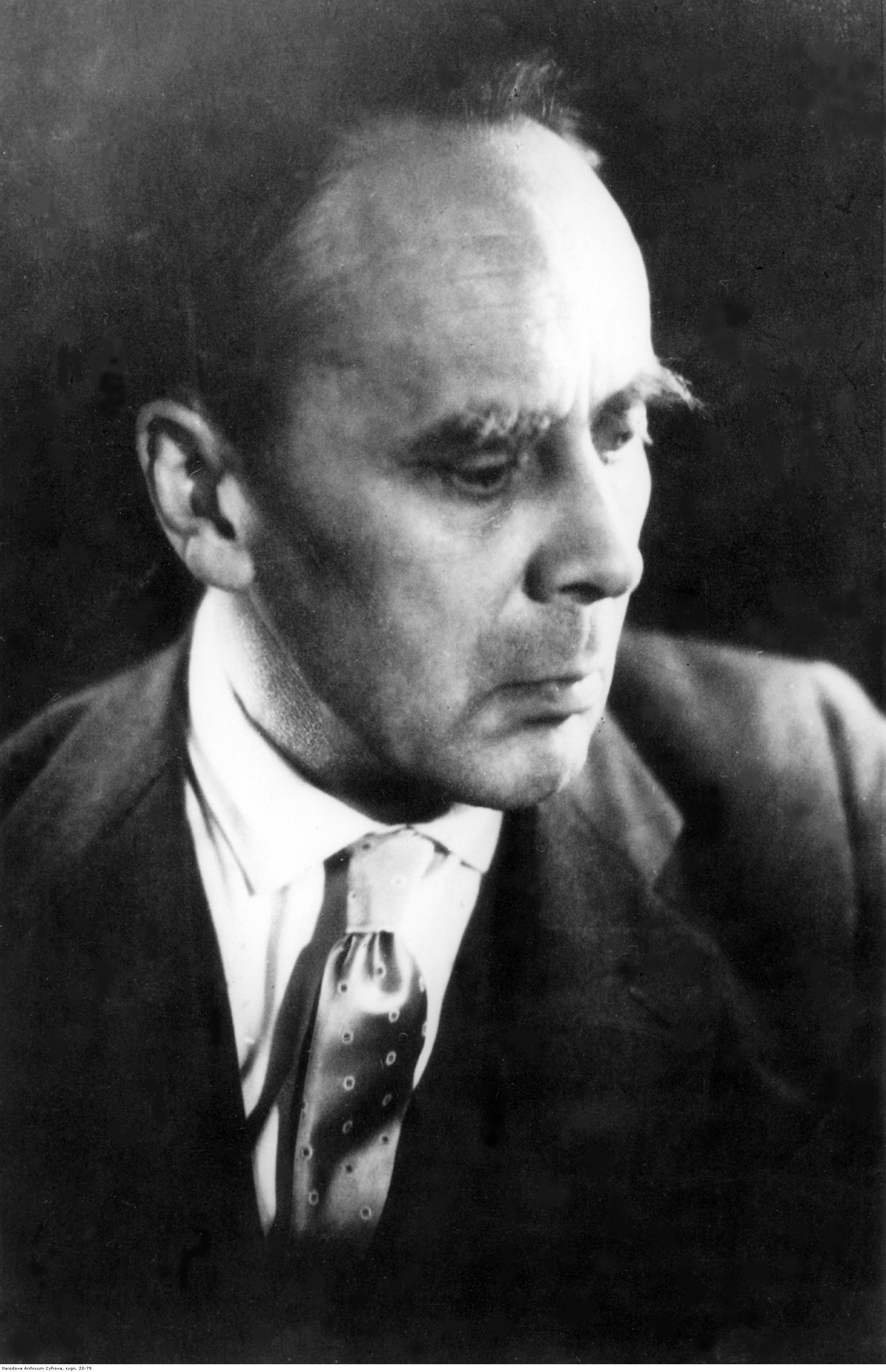
Manteuffel

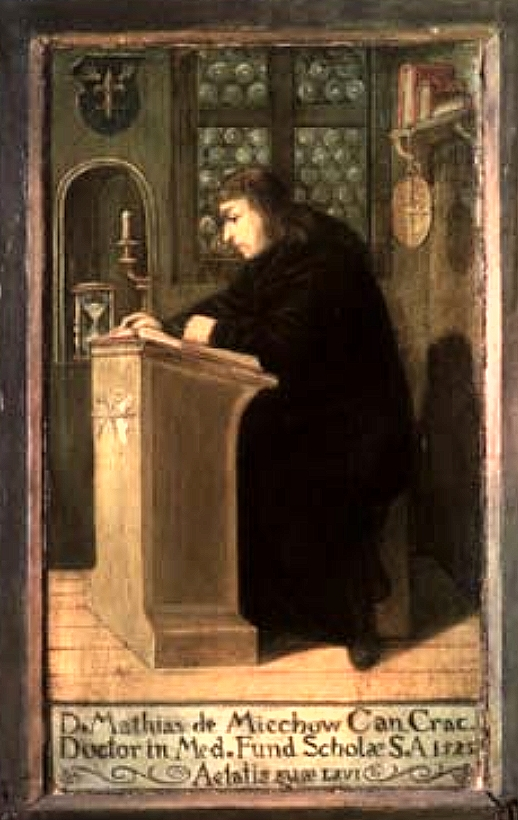
Miechowita

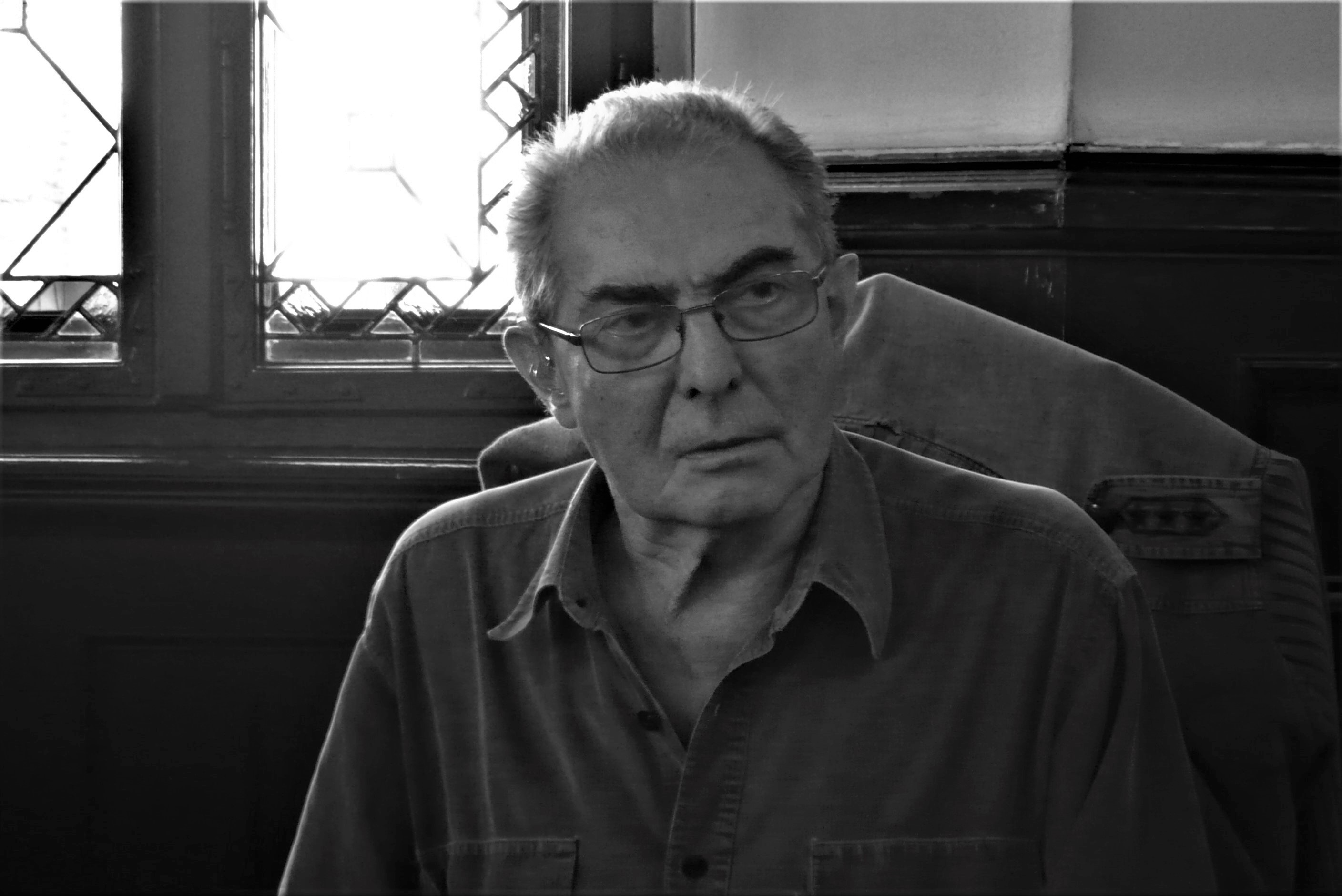
Modzelewski

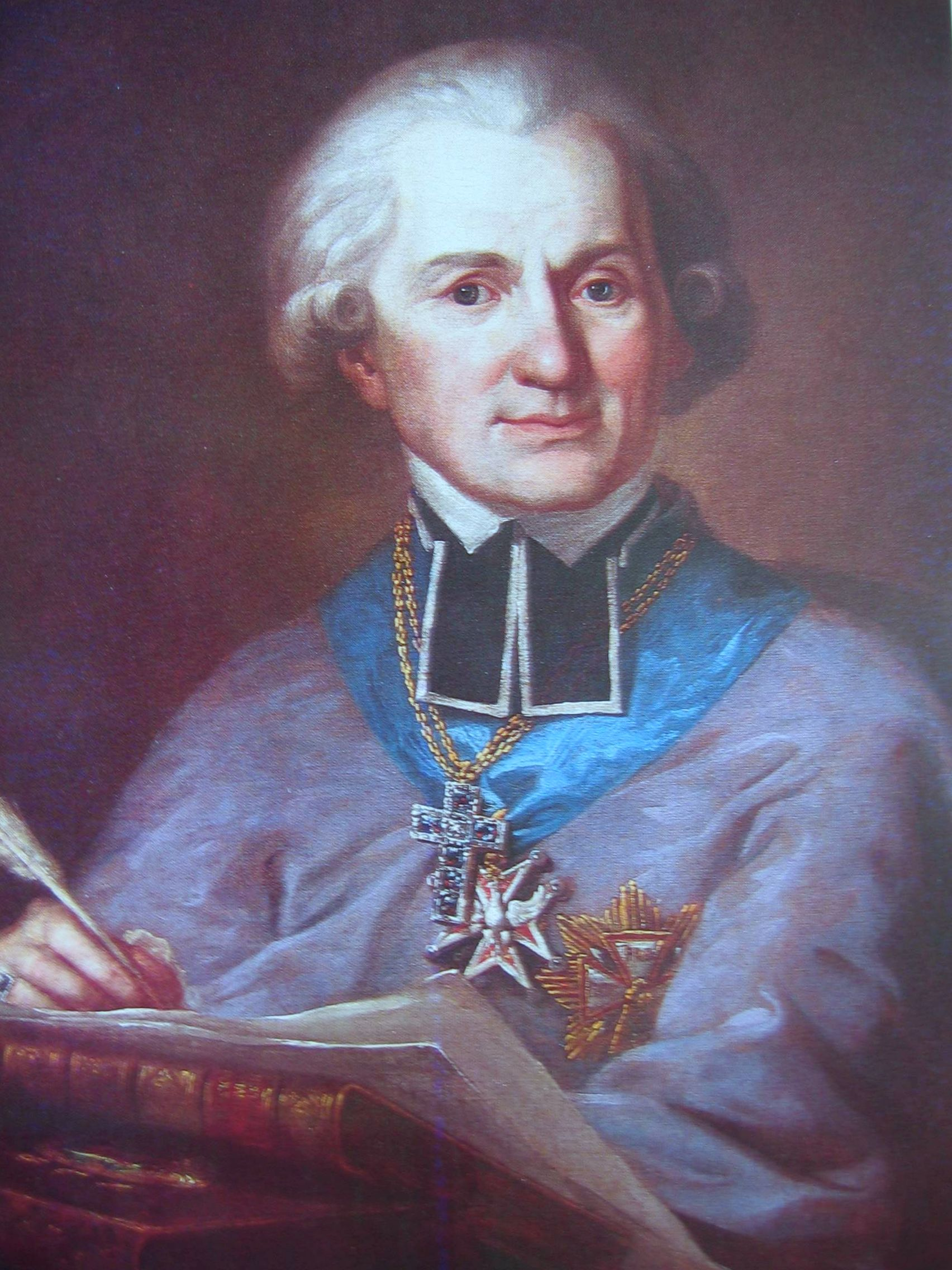
Naruszewicz

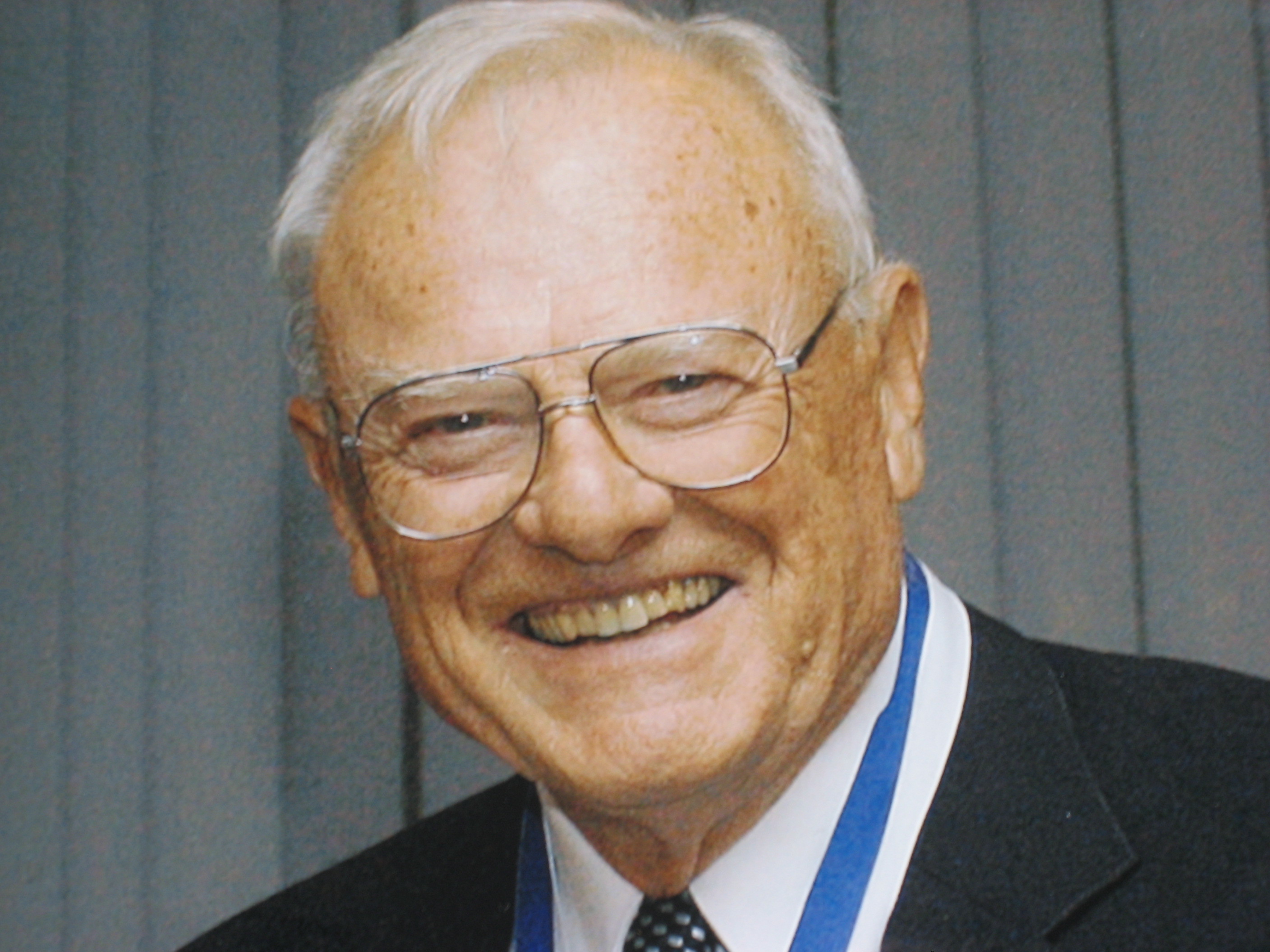
Peszke

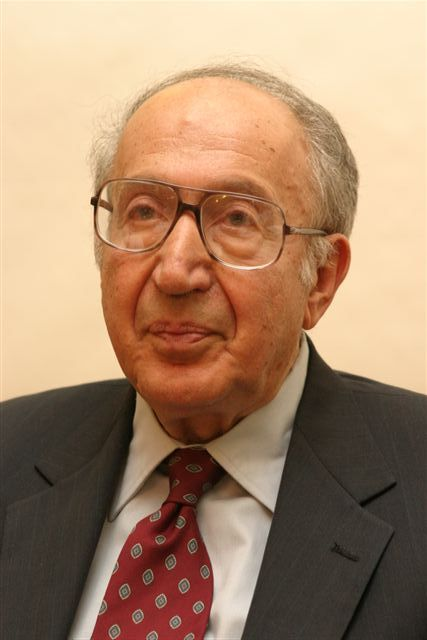
Pipes

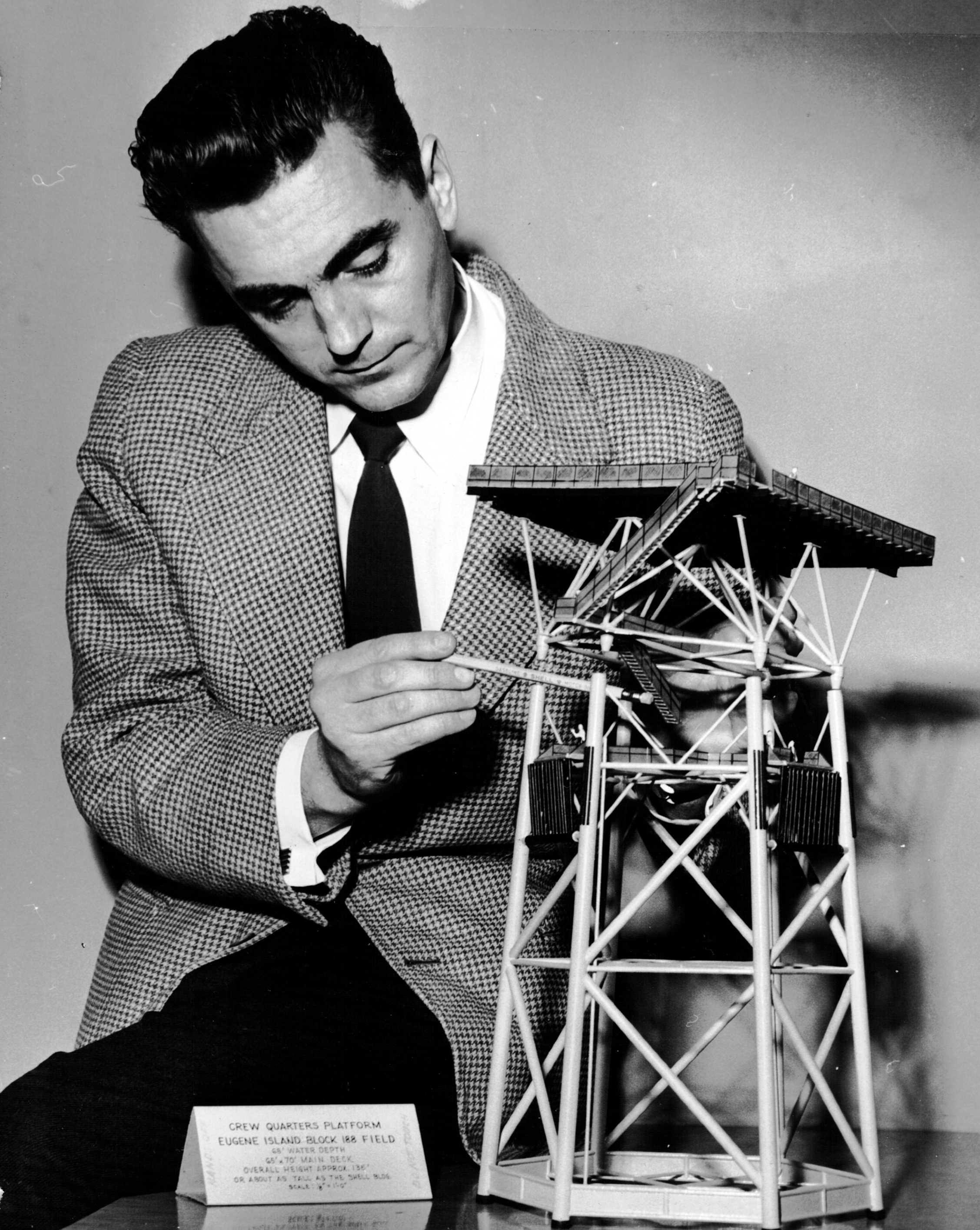
Pogonowski

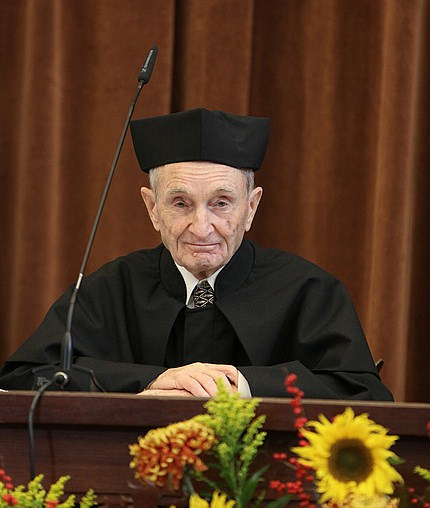
Samsonowicz

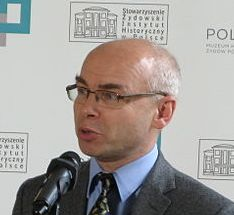
Stola

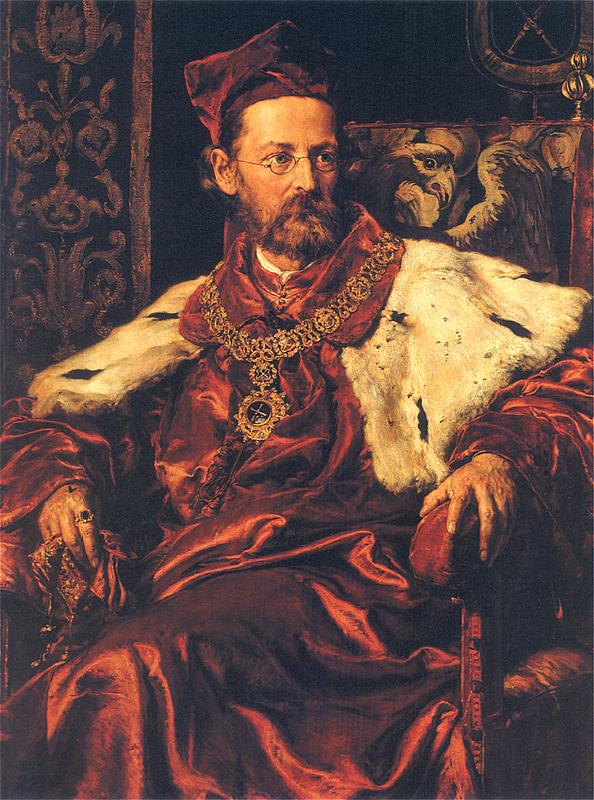
Szujski

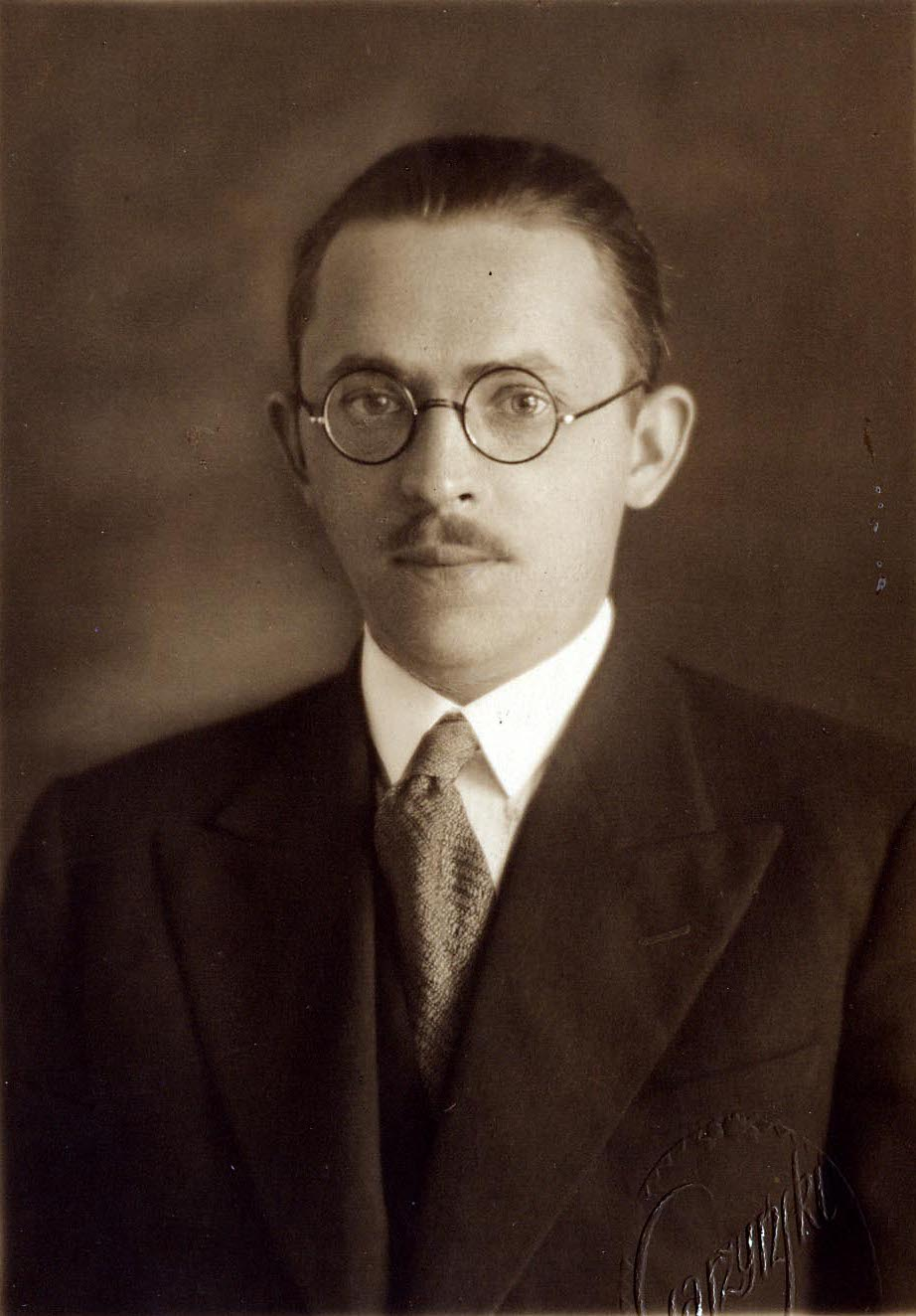
Vetulani

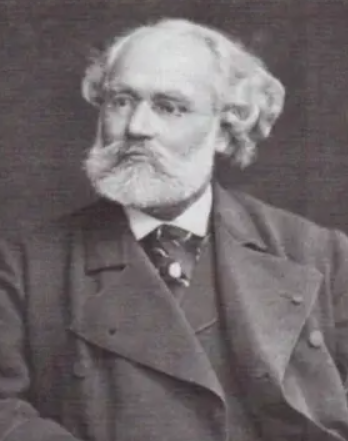
Żagiell
- Roman Aftanazy, historian of former Eastern Borderlands and librarian
- Szymon Askenazy, historian and diplomat
- Benzion Netanyahu, historian who specialized in the history of Jews in Spain
- Marcin Bielski, chronicler
- Michał Bobrzyński, historian and politician
- Józef Borzyszkowski, Kashubian historian
- Filip Callimachus
- Alina Cała
- Marek Jan Chodakiewicz
- Piotr Cywiński
- Tadeusz Czacki
- Norman Davies, British-Polish historian
- Małgorzata Dąbrowska, historian, Byzantist
- Jan Długosz, 15th-century chronicler of Poland
- Maria Dzielska
- Marian Kamil Dziewanowski, Poland, Russia, modern Europe
- Karol Estreicher (senior), father of Polish Bibliography
- Stanisław Estreicher
- Tadeusz Estreicher
- Józef Feldman
- Mieczysław Gębarowicz, art historian, museum director, custodian of Ossolineum
- Aleksander Gieysztor
- Władysław Grabski
- Roman Grodecki
- Oskar Halecki, historian of Poland
- Marceli Handelsman, historian of Poland
- Paweł Jasienica, historian of Poland
- Jacek Jędruch
- Wincenty Kadłubek, 13th-century historian of Poland
- Stefan Kieniewicz, 19th-century Polish history
- Jerzy Kirchmayer, 1944 Warsaw Uprising
- Jerzy Kolendo, archaeologist, epigraphist and historian of the Mediterranean Basin in antiquity
- Hugo Kołłątaj, 18th–19th-century historian, philosopher and politician
- Feliks Koneczny, Polish history, social philosophy
- Władysław Konopczyński, Polish and world history
- Iwona Korga, historian, president of the Józef Piłsudski Institute of America
- Stanisław Kot, historian, politician, diplomat
- Władysław Kozaczuk, military history, military intelligence, World War II
- Manfred Kridl, history of Polish culture and literature
- Marcin Kromer, 16th-century Bishop of Warmia, secretary to two Polish kings, and historian of Poland
- Jan Kucharzewski, historian and politician
- Marian Kukiel, military historian and politician
- Lucyna Kulińska
- Ewa Kurek
- Stanisław Kutrzeba, Poland, Polish law, Kraków
- Gerard Labuda
- Joachim Lelewel, historian of Poland
- Jerzy Jan Lerski
- Dariusz Libionka
- Wacław Lipiński
- Stanisław Lorentz, art historian
- Czesław Madajczyk, World War II
- Janusz Magnuski, World War II Polish and Soviet armor
- Tadeusz Manteuffel, medievalist
- Maciej Masłowski, art historian
- Benjamin Mazar (1906–1995), Israeli historian and archeologist; President of the Hebrew University of Jerusalem
- Maciej Miechowita
- Lidia Milka-Wieczorkiewicz
- Karol Modzelewski
- Stephen Mizwa
- Teodor Narbutt, Polish historian of Lithuania
- Adam Naruszewicz, 18th-century historian, participant in the Great Sejm
- Kasper Niesiecki, Jesuit lexicographer and heraldic scholar
- Szymon Okolski, 17th-century historian
- Bartosz Paprocki, Polish and Czech heraldic scholar
- Michael Alfred Peszke (1932–2015), Polish Armed Forces, World War II
- Tadeusz Piotrowski, historian of Poland during World War II
- Richard Pipes, Polish-American historian of Russia and the Soviet Union
- Iwo Cyprian Pogonowski, World War II, Polish-Jewish relations; engineer; lexicographer
- Teresa Prekerowa
- Stanisław Salmonowicz, historian of law
- Henryk Samsonowicz, historian specializing in medieval Poland
- Konstancja Skirmuntt
- Julian Stachiewicz, military historian
- Szymon Starowolski
- Aneta Stawiszyńska
- Dariusz Stola
- Maciej Stryjkowski, historian, writer, poet
- Irena Strzelecka
- Tomasz Strzembosz, Polish World War II history
- Karol Szajnocha, historian and novelist
- Józef Szujski
- Zygmunt Szweykowski, Polish literature
- Władysław Tatarkiewicz, philosophy and aesthetics
- Rafał Taubenschlag, history of law
- Janusz Tazbir, historian, specializing in the culture and religion of Poland in the 16th and 17th centuries
- Józef Turowski, World War II OUN massacres of Poles
- Adam Ulam, Polish-American historian of Russia and the Soviet Union
- Adam Vetulani, history of law
- Piotr S. Wandycz, Polish-American historian of Central and Eastern Europe
- Leon Wasilewski
- Ewa Wipszycka, historian and papyrologist
- Richard Woytak, World War II era
- Julia Zabłocka (1931–1993), historian, classical scholar, archaeologist
- Wincenty Zakrzewski, 16th-century Poland
- Adam Zamoyski
- Janusz K. Zawodny, World War II
- Ignacy Żagiell (1826–1891), historian of ancient Egypt
- Marek Żukow-Karczewski, historian and journalist
- Kazimierz Żurowski, archaeologist

== Philosophy ==
- Adam of Łowicz
- Edward Abramowski
- Kazimierz Ajdukiewicz
- Zygmunt Bauman
- Stefan Błachowski
- Józef Maria Bocheński
- Anna Brożek
- Stanisław Brzozowski
- Adam Burski
- Piotr Chmielowski
- Leon Chwistek
- August Cieszkowski
- Nicolaus Copernicus
- Edward Dembowski
- Anioł Dowgird
- Adolf Dygasiński
- Michał Falkener
- Ludwik Fleck, 20th-century philosopher of science
- Danuta Gierulanka
- Józef Gołuchowski
- Wawrzyniec Grzymała Goślicki
- Jakub Górski
- Grzegorz of Stawiszyn
- Joanna Hańderek
- Jan Hartman
- Władysław Heinrich
- Michał Heller
- Józef Maria Hoene-Wroński
- Janina Hosiasson-Lindenbaum
- Roman Ingarden
- Jakub of Gostynin
- Jan of Głogów
- Jan of Stobnica
- Józef Emanuel Jankowski
- Feliks Jaroński
- Stanisław Jaśkowski
- Jan Jonston
- Leszek Kołakowski
- Hugo Kołłątaj
- Alfred Korzybski
- Tadeusz Kotarbiński
- Władysław Mieczysław Kozłowski
- Józef Kremer
- Franciszek Krupiński
- Krystyn Lach-Szyrma
- Irena Lasota
- Katarzyna de Lazari-Radek
- Stanisław Leszczyński
- Stanisław Leśniewski
- Casimir Lewy
- Karol Libelt
- Wincenty Lutosławski
- Jan Łukasiewicz
- Kazimierz Łyszczyński
- Adam Mahrburg
- Ewa Majewska
- Marian Massonius
- Émile Meyerson
- Konstanty Michalski
- Wawrzyniec Mitzler de Kolof
- Andrzej Frycz Modrzewski
- Julian Ochorowicz
- Maria Ossowska
- Stefan Pawlicki
- Leon Petrażycki
- Sebastian Petrycy
- Bolesław Prus
- Adam Schaff
- Ulrich Schrade
- Barbara Skarga
- Stanisław Staszic
- Józef Supiński
- Józef Kalasanty Szaniawski
- Jan Szylling
- Maria Szyszkowska
- Jan Śniadecki
- Jędrzej Śniadecki
- Magdalena Środa
- Aleksander Świętochowski
- Alfred Tarski
- Władysław Tatarkiewicz
- Józef Tischner
- Andrzej Towiański
- Bronisław Trentowski
- Anna-Teresa Tymieniecka
- Kazimierz Twardowski
- Michał Twaróg of Bystrzyków
- Vitello
- Józef Warszawski
- Władysław Weryho
- Michał Wiszniewski
- Stanisław Ignacy Witkiewicz (Witkacy)
- Władysław Witwicki
- Karol Wojtyla
- Jan Woleński
- Adam Ignacy Zabellewicz
- Marian Zdziechowski
- Eleonora Ziemięcka
- Czesław Znamierowski
- Florian Znaniecki
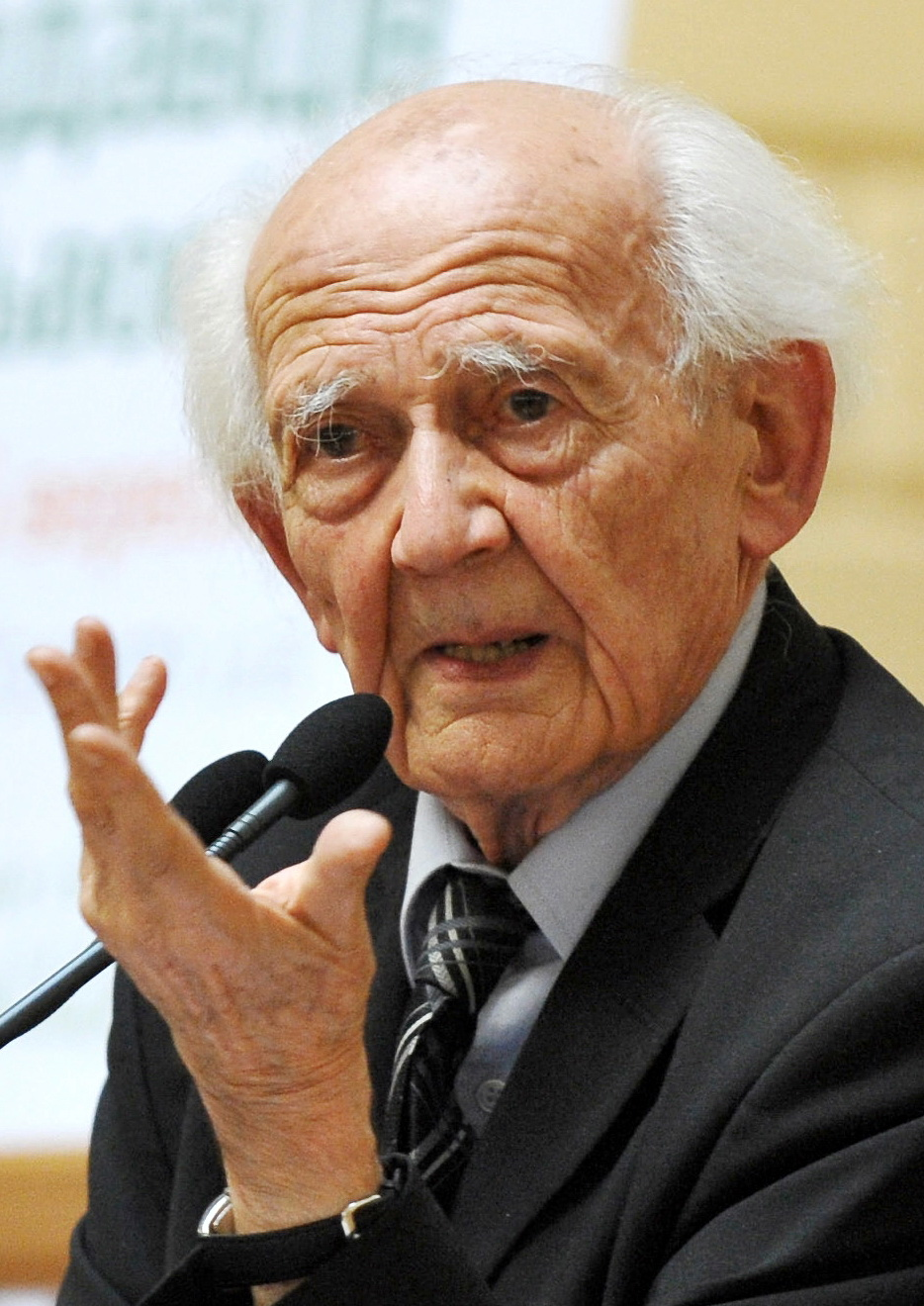
Bauman

Brzozowski

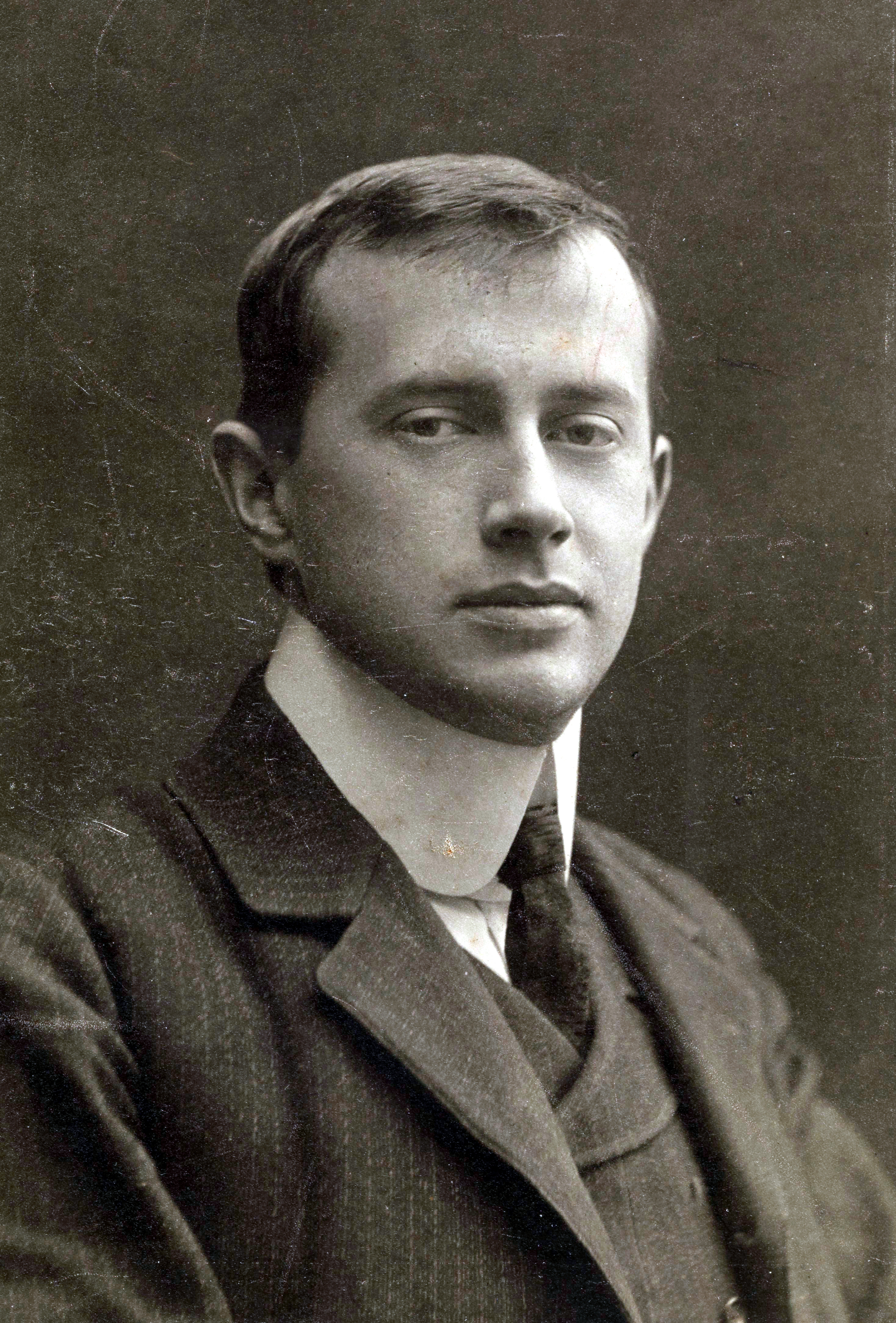
Chwistek

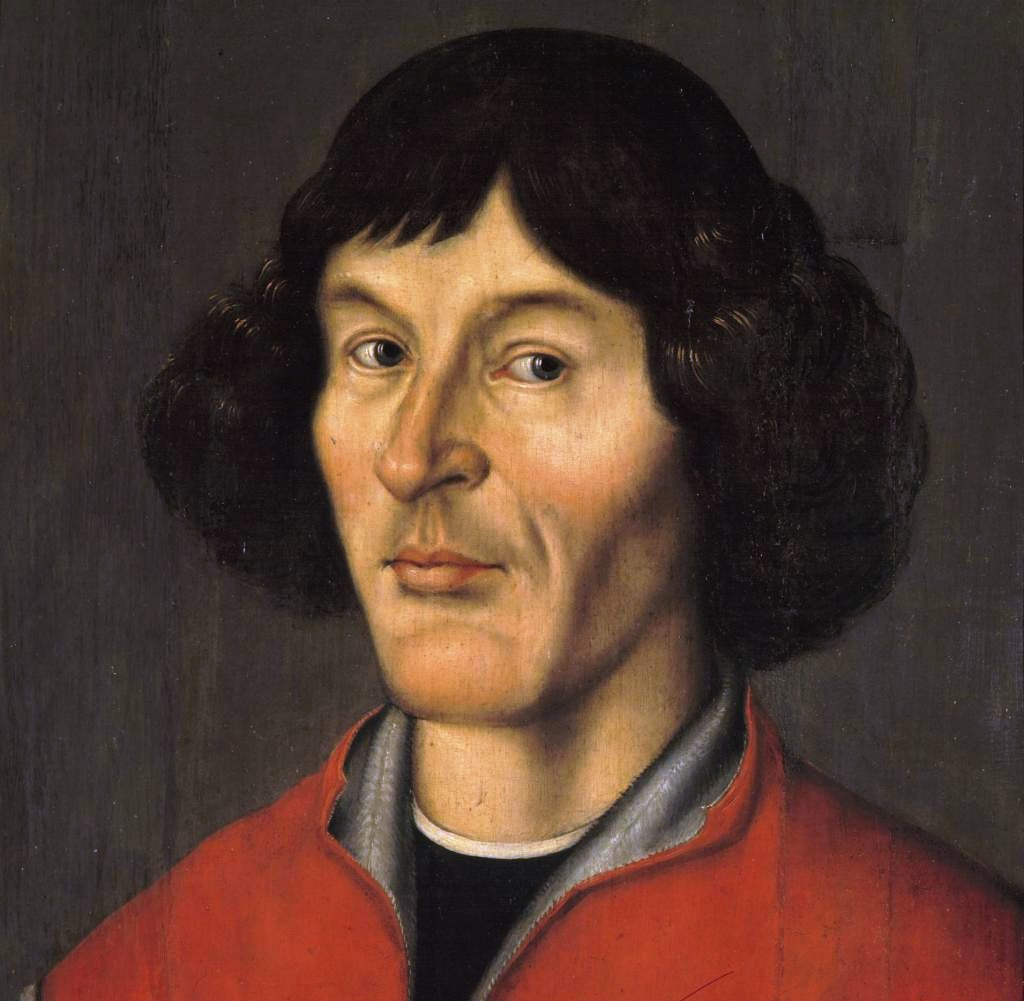
Copernicus

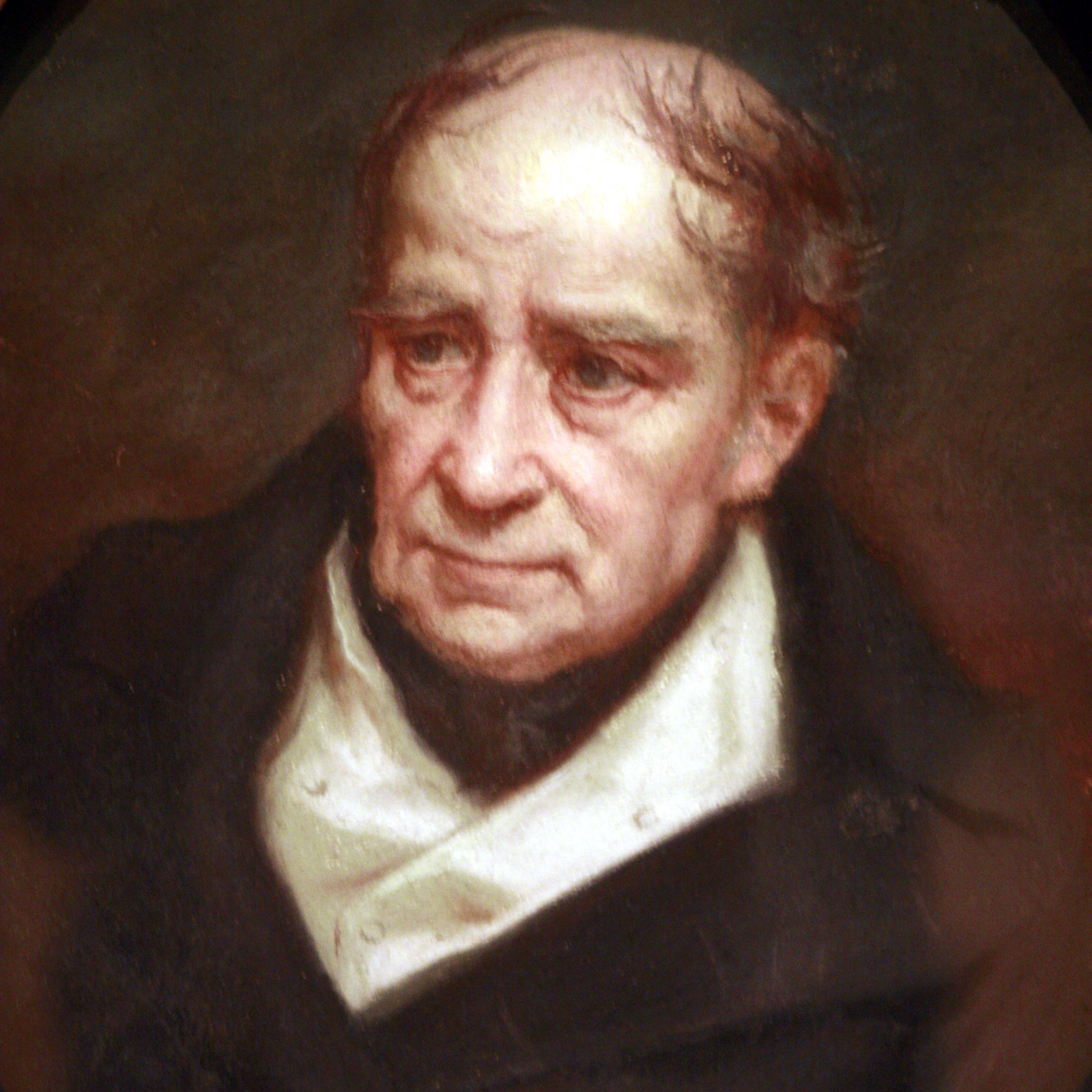
Hoene–Wroński

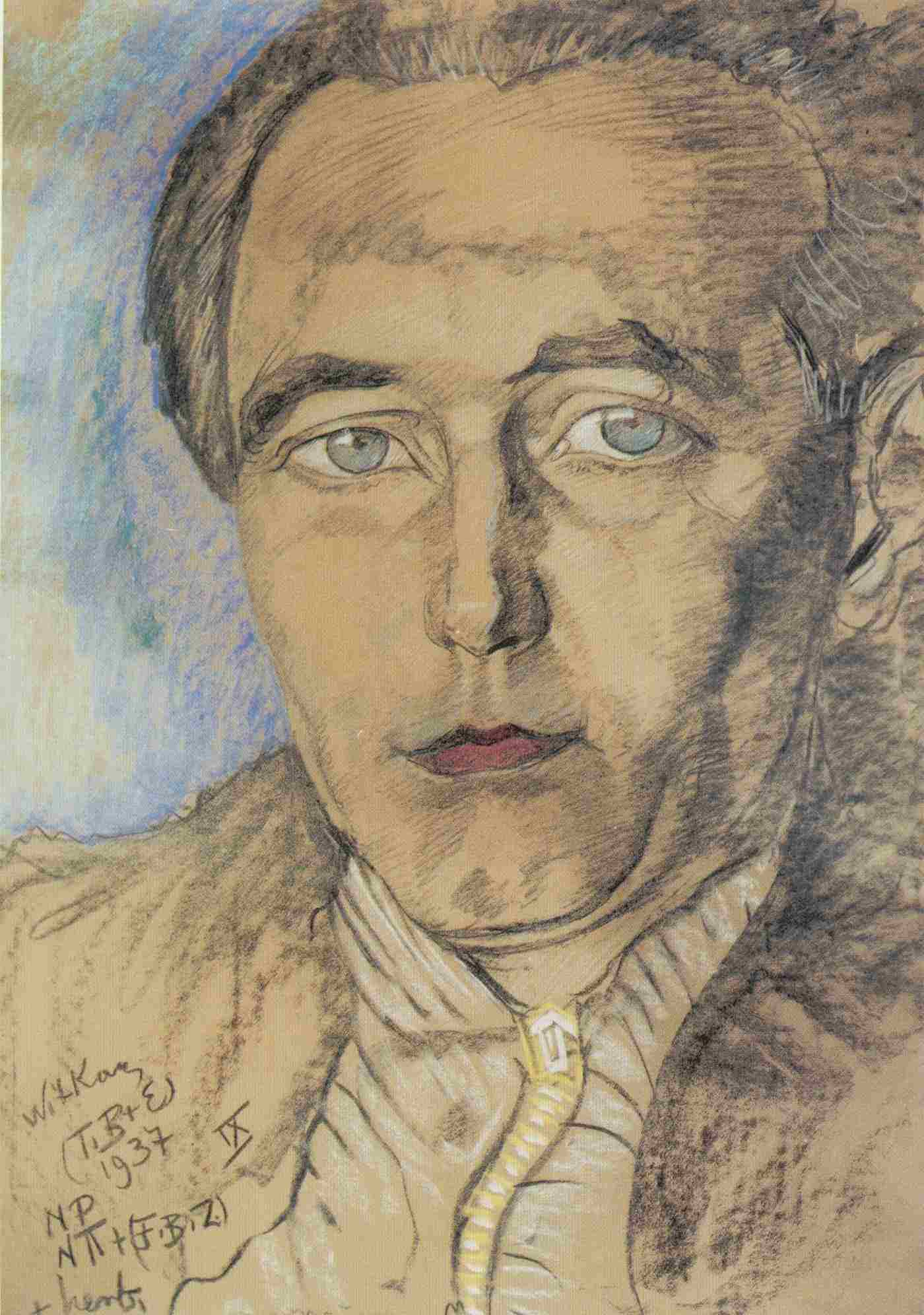
Ingarden

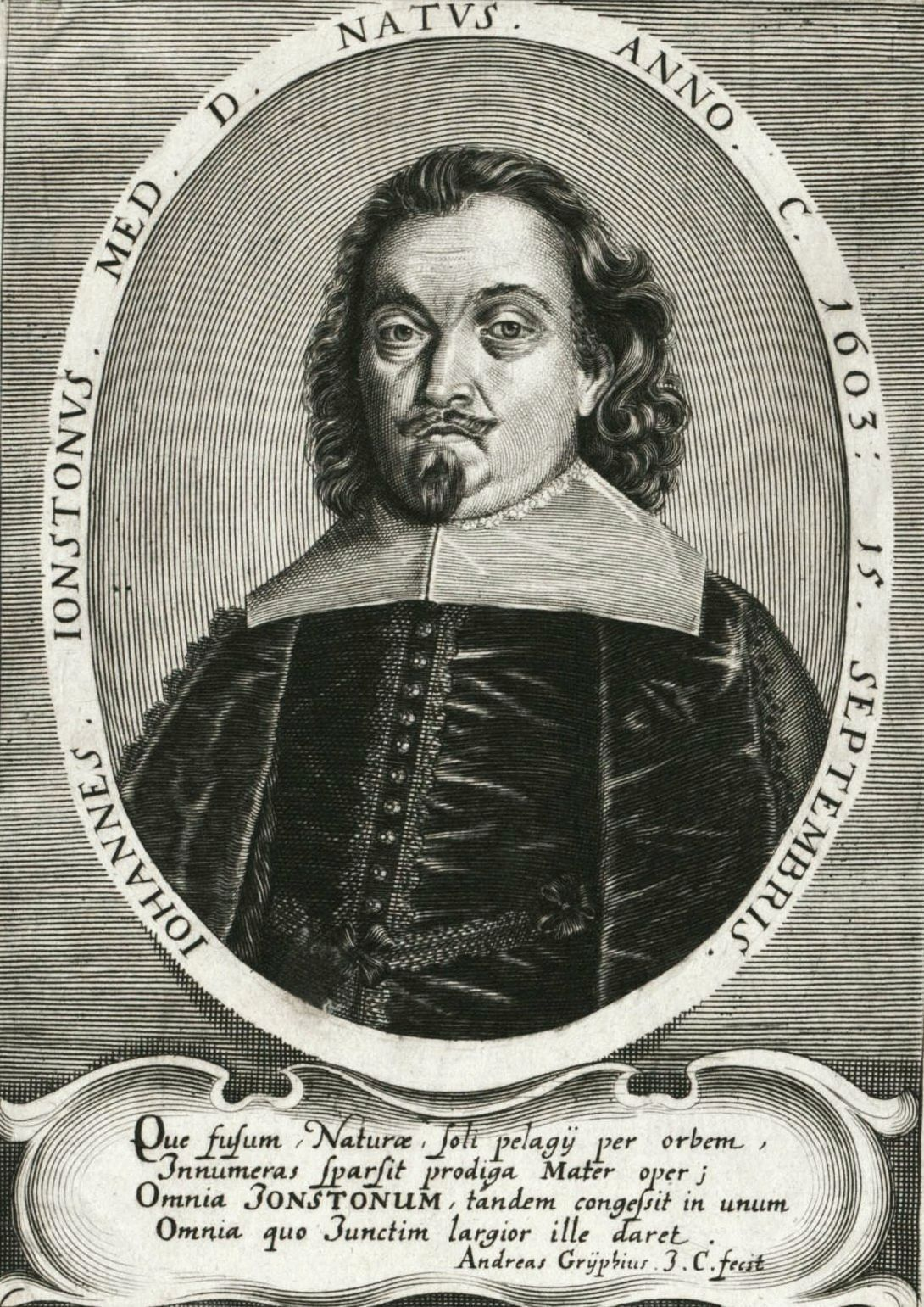
Jonston

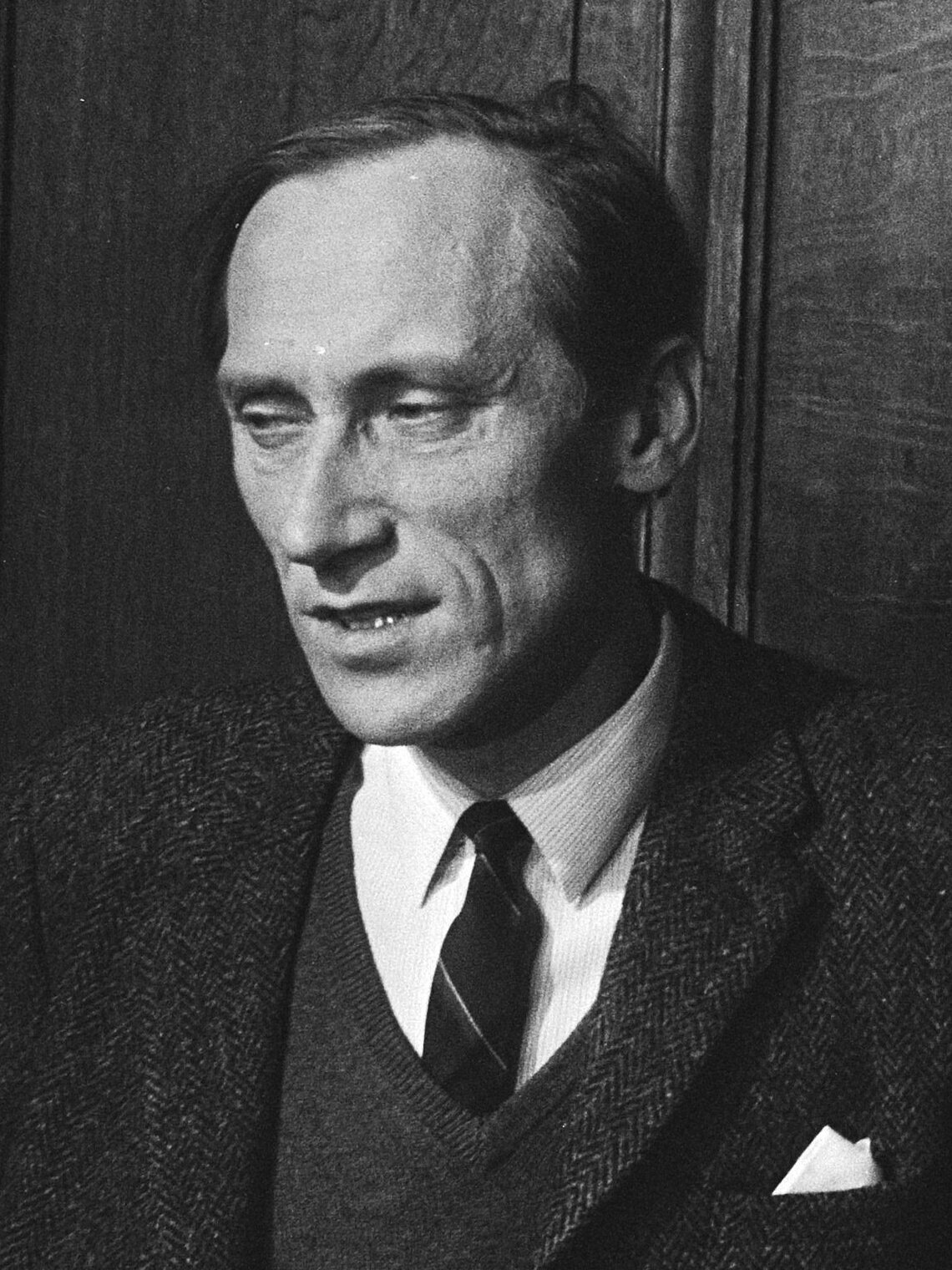
Kołakowski

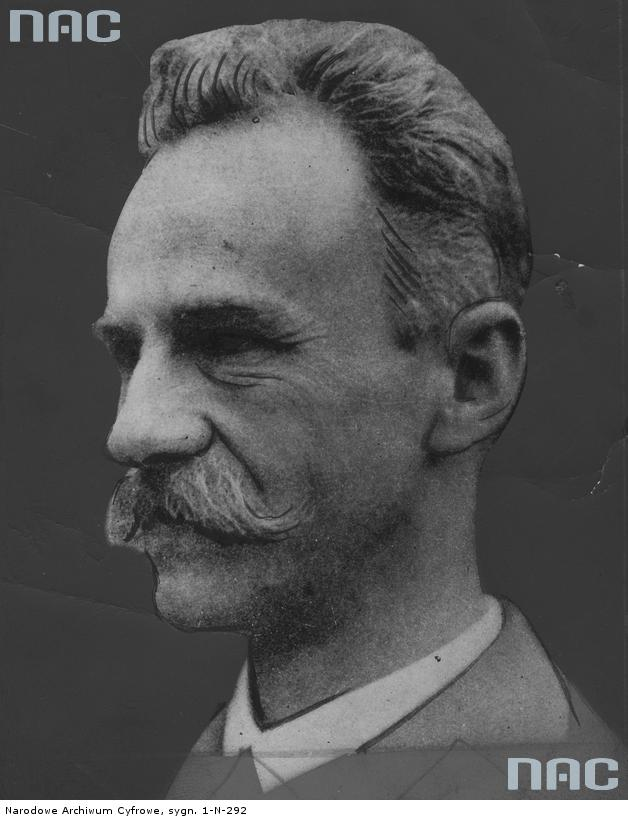
Kotarbiński

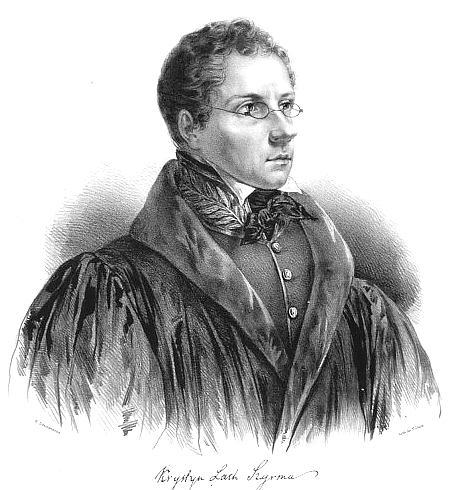
Lach-Szyrma

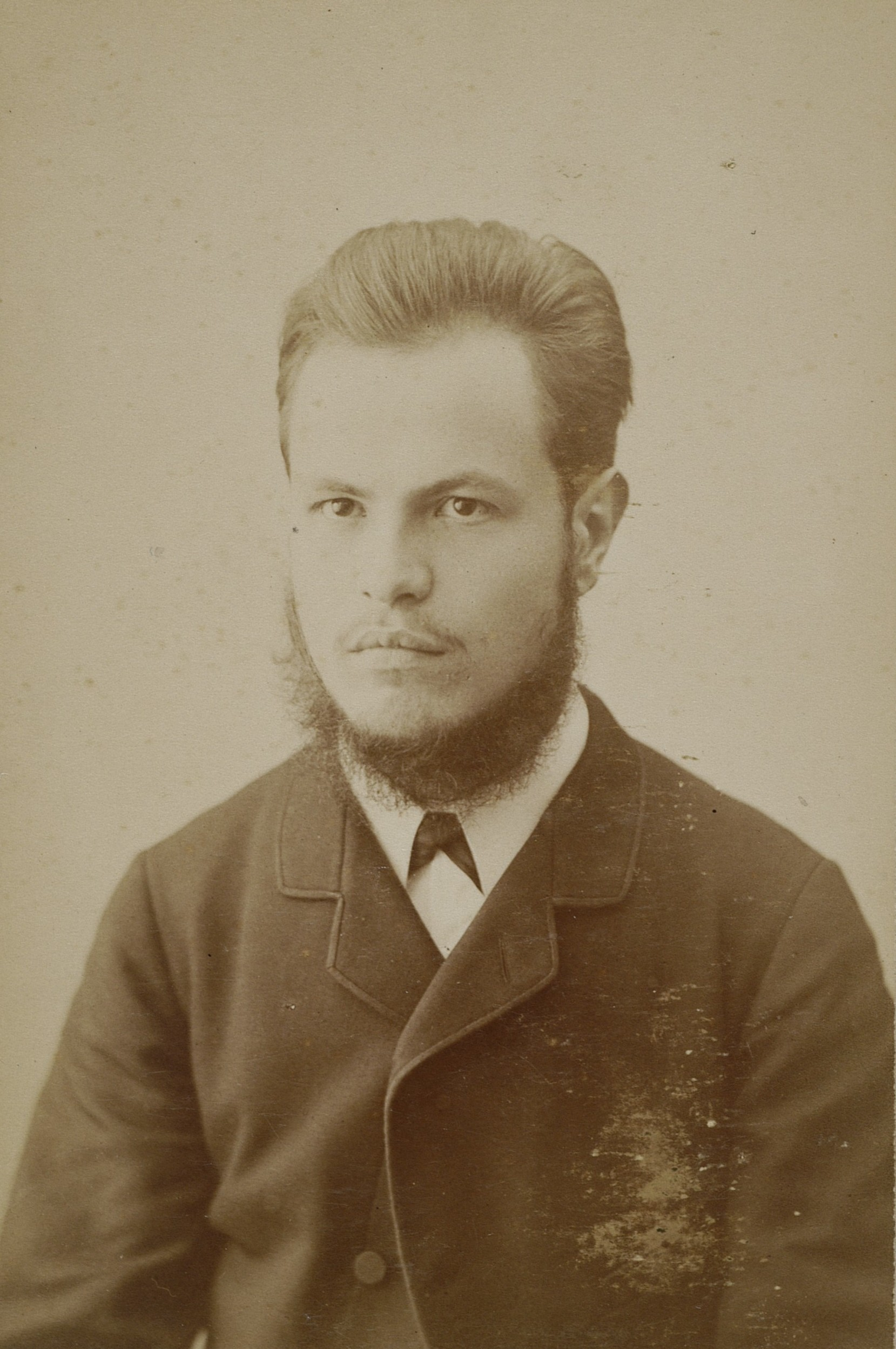
Lutosławski

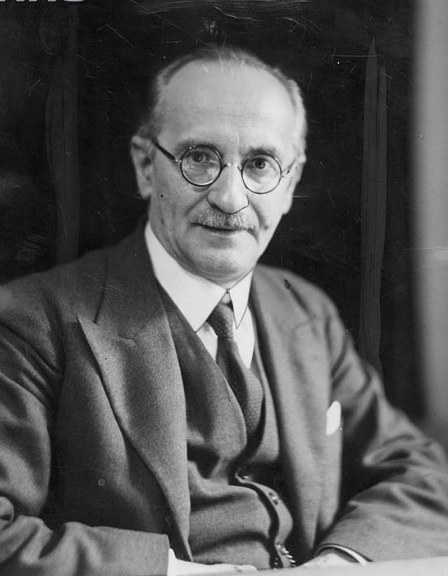
Łukasiewicz

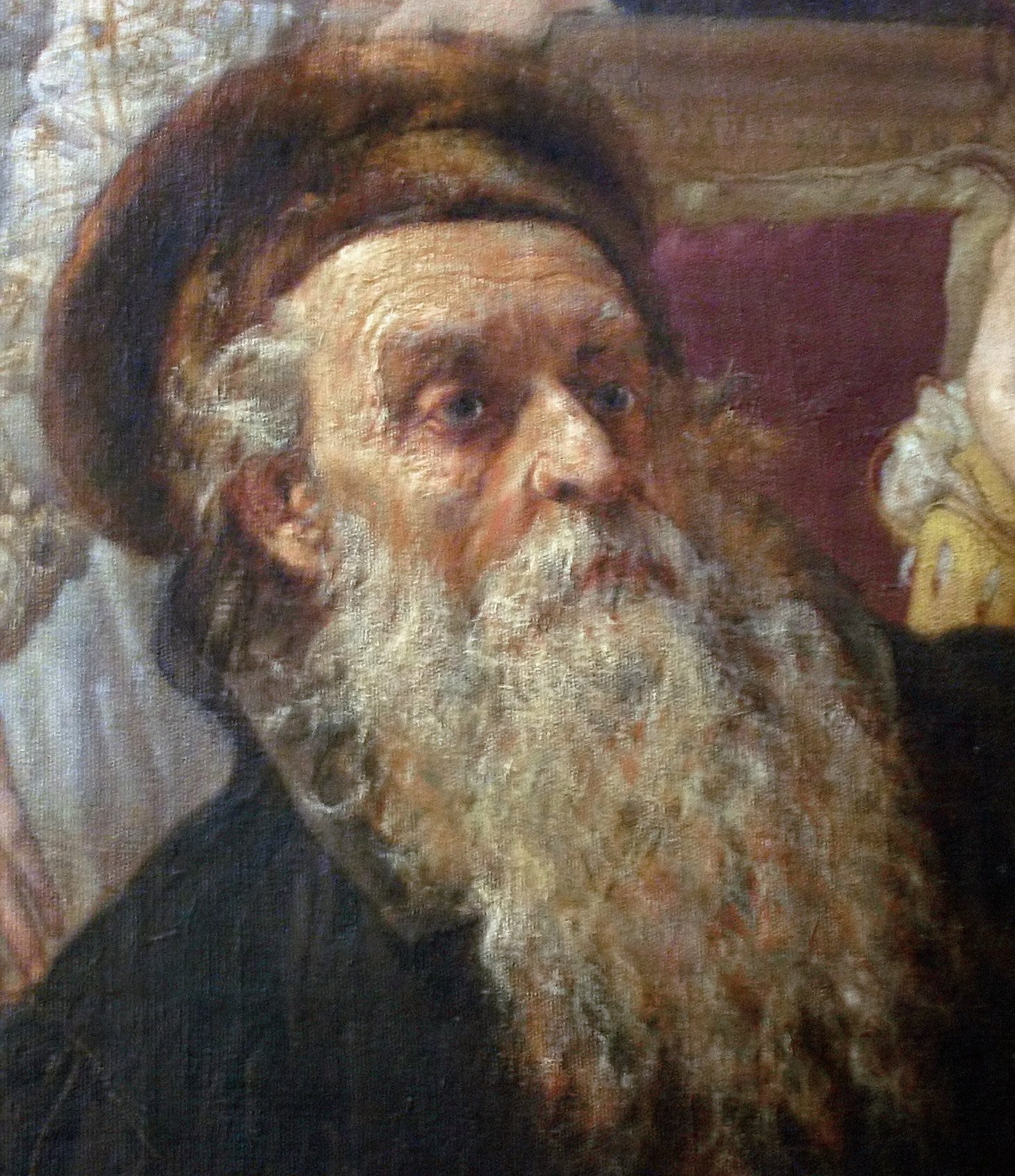
Modrzewski

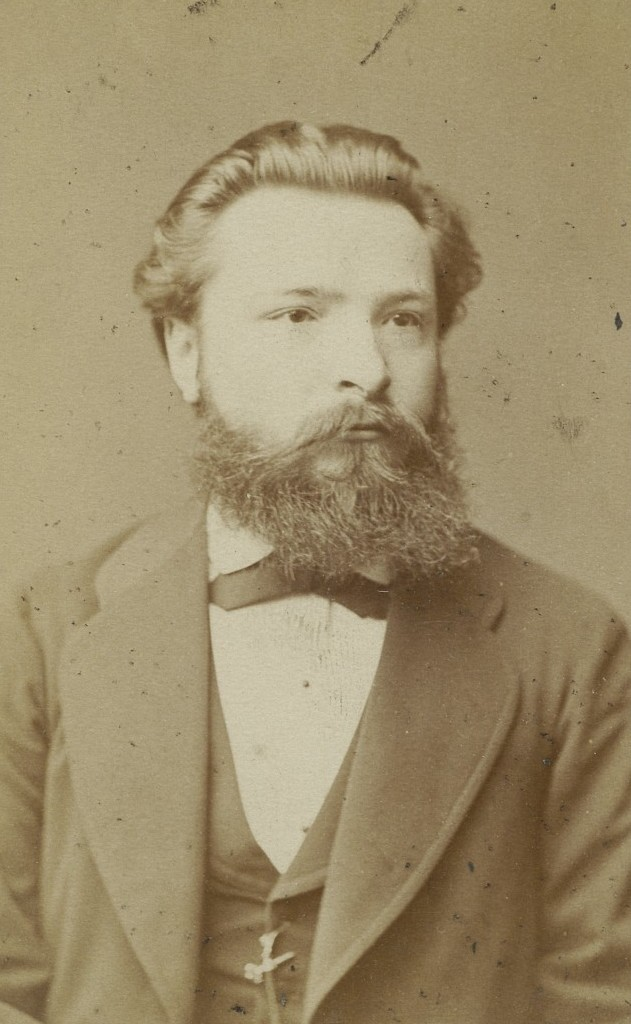
Ochorowicz

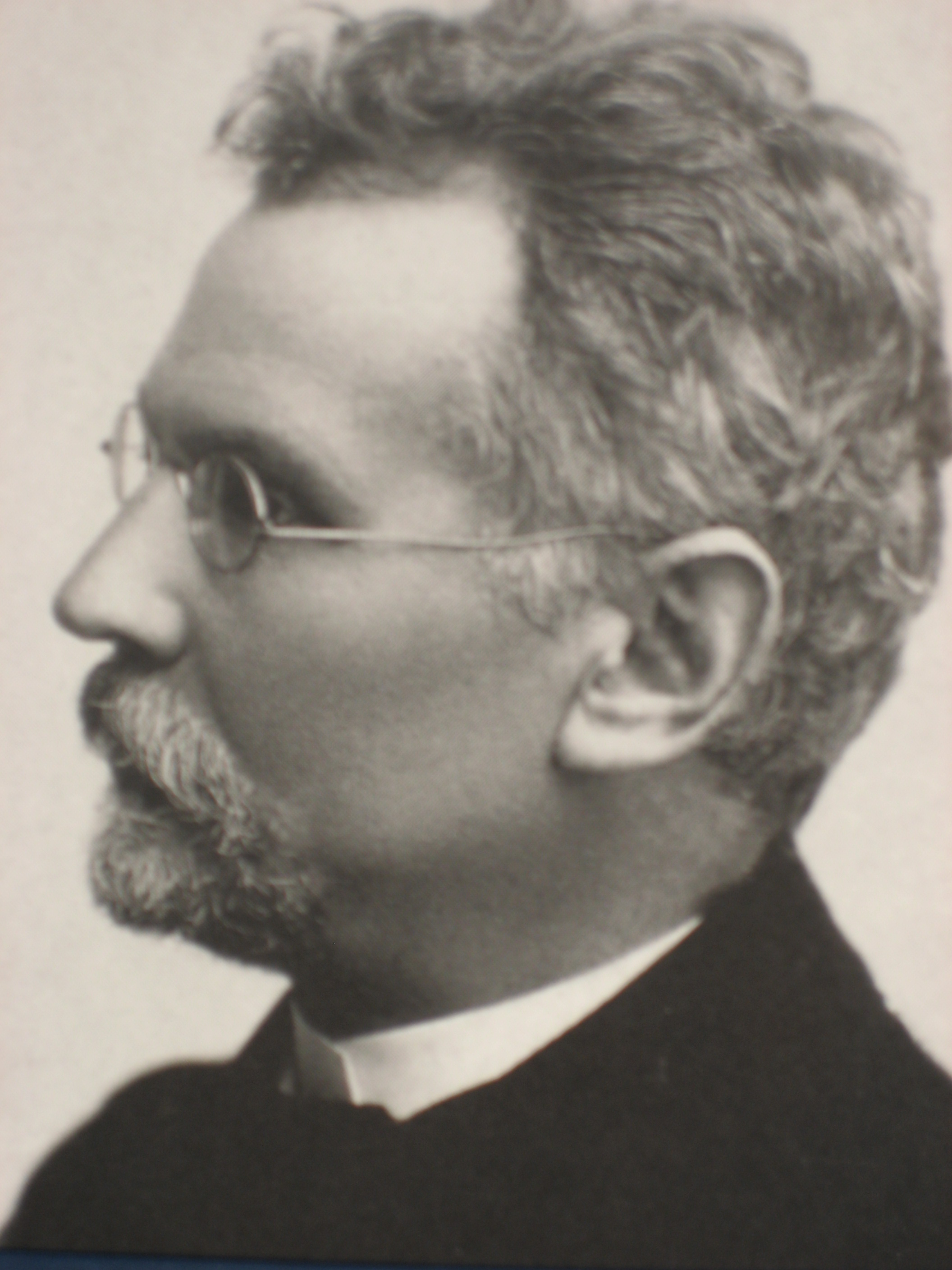
Prus

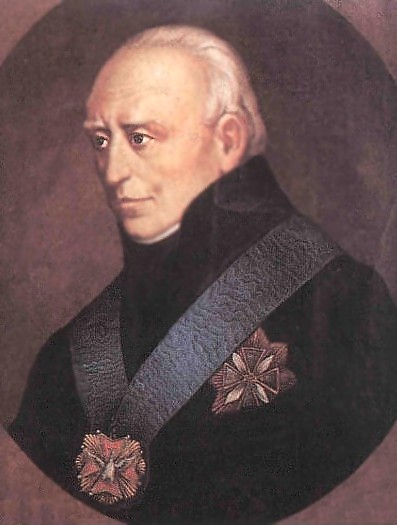
Staszic

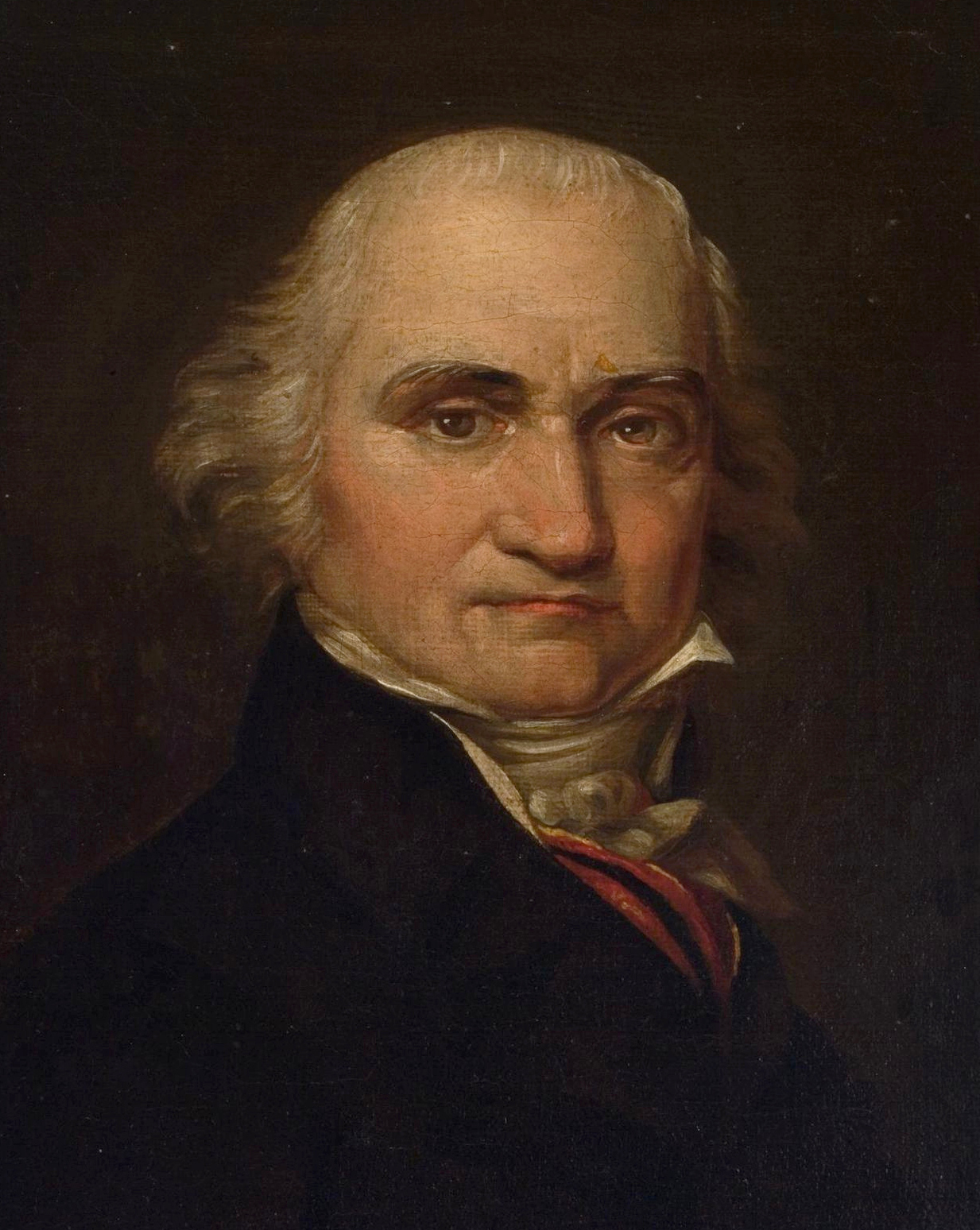
Jan Śniadecki

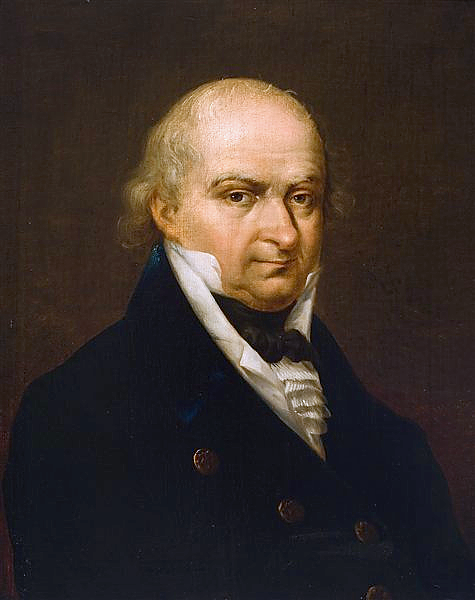
Jędrzej Śniadecki

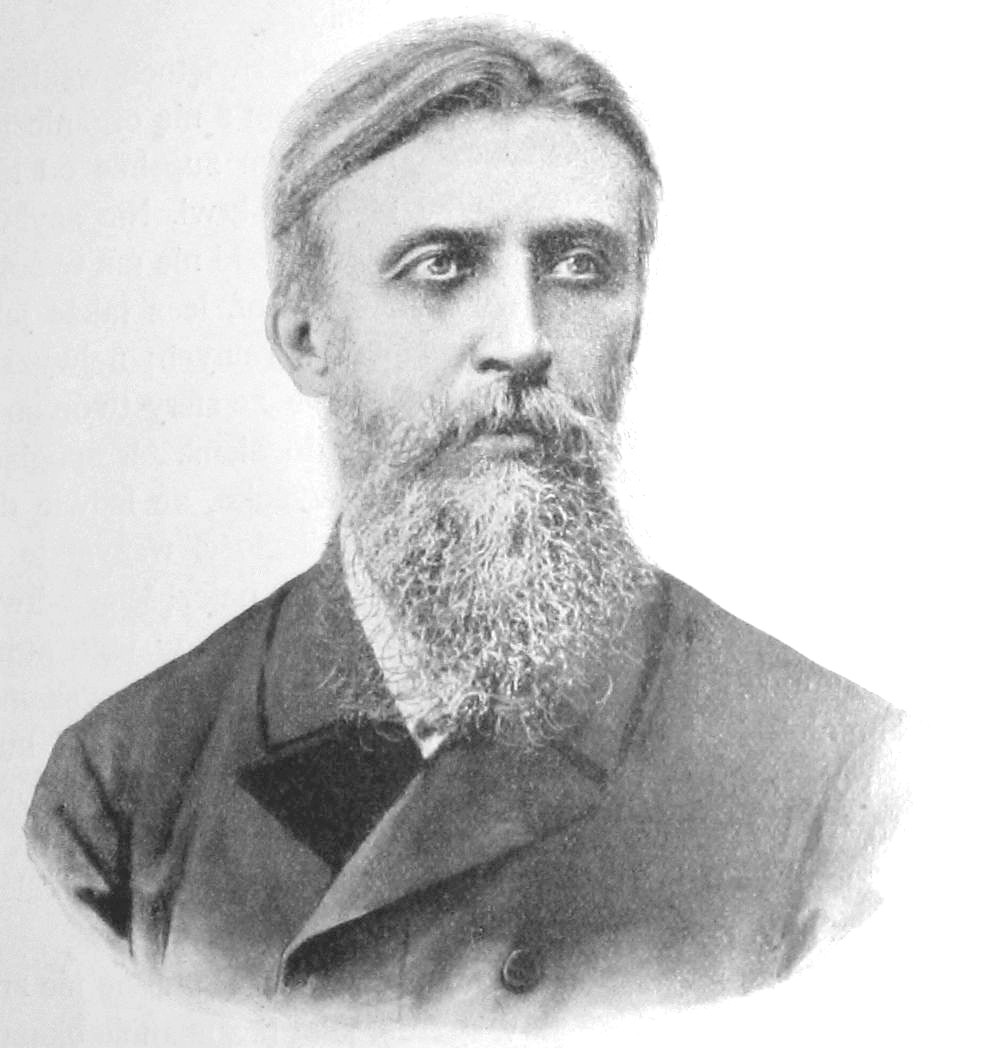
Świętochowski

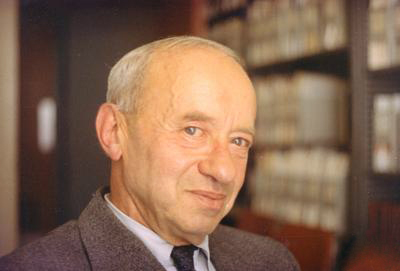
Tarski

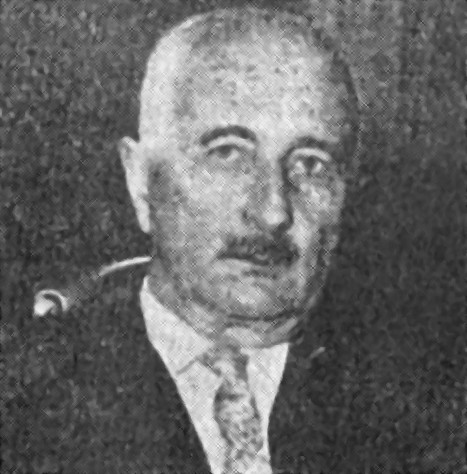
Tatarkiewicz

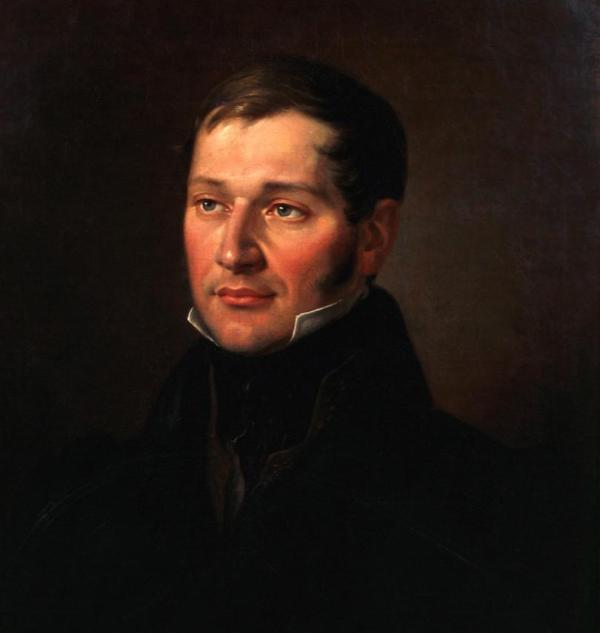
Towiański

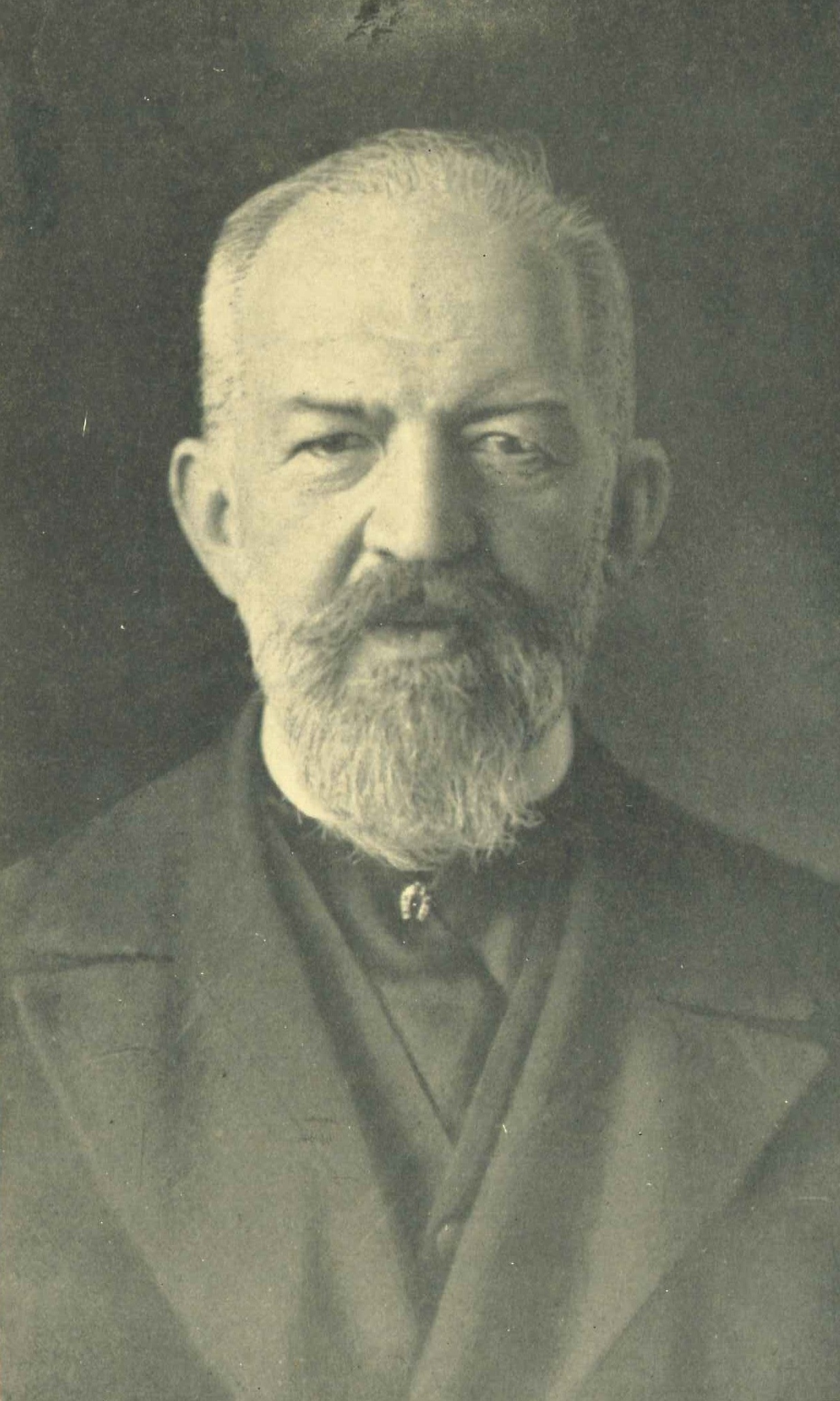
Twardowski

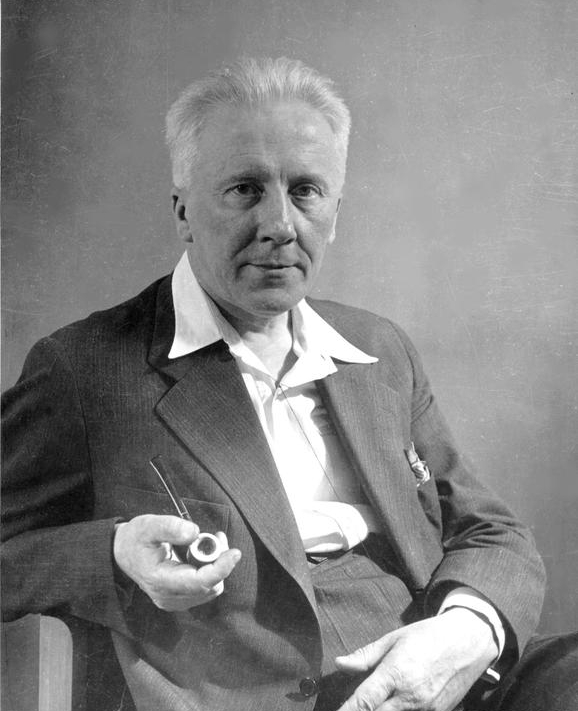
Witwicki

== Prose literature ==
- Franciszka Arnsztajnowa, playwright
- S. Ansky, Bielorussian, Polish-Jewish author of The Dybbuk
- Joanna Bator, novelist, feminist
- Witold Bełza, librarian, writer, publicist on Bydgoszcz
- Halina Birenbaum, Polish Israeli writer, translator, chronicler of the martyrdom of Polish Jewry
- Karol Olgierd Borchardt, maritime author
- Tadeusz Borowski, writer and journalist
- Tadeusz Boy-Żeleński, writer; translator of over 100 French literary classics
- Edmund Chojecki, journalist based in France
- Joanna Chmielewska, crime writer
- Sylwia Chutnik, novelist, feminist, social activist
- Joseph Conrad (Józef Teodor Konrad Korzeniowski), English-language novelist
- Stanisław Czerniecki, landowner and chef, author of the first Cookery book in Polish 1682
- Lucyna Ćwierczakiewiczowa, cookbook author
- Maria Dąbrowska, novelist and translator of the Diary of Samuel Pepys into Polish
- Johannes Dantiscus (Jan Dantyszek), Latin poet and Prince-Bishop of Warmia
- Jacek Dehnel, writer, poet, translator, painter
- Tadeusz Dołęga-Mostowicz, author of the novel, The Career of Nicodemus Dyzma
- Jacek Dukaj, science-fiction writer
- Adolf Dygasiński, novelist
- Janina Dziarnowska, writer and translator, publicist, and expert on Soviet literature
- Leszek Engelking, short story writer
- Felicjan Medard Faleński, poet, novelist
- Aleksander Fredro, poet, comedy writer
- Aleksandra Gajewska, theatre director, actress, writer, poet, politician
- Jerzy Giedroyć, legendary émigré editor (Kultura)'
- Abelard Giza, writer, comedian, actor, filmmaker
- Janusz Głowacki, playwright, nonfiction author
- Ferdynand Goetel, novelist, playwright, essayist
- Witold Gombrowicz, novelist, playwright
- Stefan Grabiński, horror writer
- Mieczysław Grydzewski, legendary editor (Skamander, Wiadomości Literackie)
- Henryk Grynberg, writer
- Adam Grzymała-Siedlecki, literary and theater critic
- Józef Hen, novelist, essayist, playwright, screenwriter, and reporter
- Gustaw Herling-Grudziński, writer, journalist, essayist, World War II underground fighter
- Marek Hłasko, novelist, short story writer
- Klementyna Hoffmanowa, writer of memoir and children's literature
- Paweł Huelle, essayist
- Juliusz Kaden-Bandrowski
- Wincenty Kadłubek, political scientist, writer, chronicler
- Ryszard Kapuściński, writer and journalist
- Wojciech Karpiński, writer and essayist
- Maria Konopnicka, writer, novelist
- Tadeusz Konwicki, writer
- Janusz Korczak, writer, pedagogist
- Jerzy Kosiński, writer
- Zofia Kossak-Szczucka, novelist and World War II resistance fighter
- Stefania Kossowska, journalist, writer, editor and broadcaster in émigré London
- Marek Krajewski, crime writer, known for his series of novels set in pre-war Wrocław with Eberhard Mock as the protagonist
- Hanna Krall, writer
- Ignacy Krasicki, author of the first Polish novel, The Adventures of Mr. Nicholas Wisdom, and of Fables and Parables
- Józef Ignacy Kraszewski, Poland's most prolific writer (and one of the world's most prolific), noted especially for his historical novels
- Wojciech Kuczok, novelist, screenwriter, film critic
- Antoni Lange, writer, poet, philosopher
- Stanisław Lem, science-fiction writer, essayist, philosopher
- Stanisław Lubieniecki, writer, astronomer* Waldemar Łysiak, writer
- Józef Mackiewicz, writer, journalist
- Kornel Makuszyński, children's writer
- Dorota Masłowska, writer and playwright
- Juliusz Mieroszewski, publicist, translator of Orwell's 1984 into Polish
- Kazimierz Moczarski, writer and journalist
- Sławomir Mrożek, dramatist and writer
- Wiesław Myśliwski, novelist
- Anna Nakwaska, children's author and educationist
- Joanna Olczak-Ronikier, novelist
- Eliza Orzeszkowa, Positivist writer
- Ferdynand Antoni Ossendowski, writer
- Teodor Parnicki, historical novelist
- Jan Chryzostom Pasek, memoirist
- Sergiusz Piasecki, writer
- Krzysztof Piesiewicz, screenwriter and politician
- Jerzy Pilch, writer, columnist, journalist
- Elena Poniatowska, columnist and novelist
- Jan Potocki, The Saragossa Manuscript
- Bolesław Prus, The Doll and Pharaoh
- Ksawery Pruszyński, writer and journalist
- Stanisława Przybyszewska
- Stanisław Przybyszewski, novelist, dramatist, and poet who wrote in both German and Polish
- Mikołaj Rej, a founder of Polish literary language and literature
- Małgorzata Rejmer, writer
- Sydor Rey, writer, poet, novelist
- Władysław Reymont, 1924 Nobel laureate
- Zyta Rudzka, novelist
- Henryk Rzewuski, novelist
- Pinchas Sadeh, Israeli novelist and poet
- Barbara Sanguszko, enlightenment writer and salon hostess
- Andrzej Sapkowski, fantasy writer
- Sat-Okh, Polish-Shawnee writer
- Bruno Schulz, novelist and painter
- Henryk Sienkiewicz, 1905 Nobel laureate
- Isaac Bashevis Singer, 1978 Nobel laureate
- Piotr Skarga, poet, writer, humanist
- Jędrzej Śniadecki, terminologist, writer
- Andrzej Stasiuk, writer, journalist, literary critic
- Agnieszka Stelmaszyk, writer, novelist
- Stefan Themerson, children's writer, film maker, inventor of "semantic poetry", philosopher
- Olga Tokarczuk, writer, psychologist, 2019 Nobel laureate
- Magdalena Tulli, novelist, translator
- Marian Turwid, writer and painter from Bydgoszcz
- Leopold Tyrmand, writer
- Meyer Wolf Weisgal, American journalist, publisher, and playwright; President of the Weizmann Institute of Science
- Józef Weyssenhoff, novelist, poet, literary critic
- Stanisław Ignacy Witkiewicz (Witkacy)
- Stanisław Wyspiański, painter and writer
- Franciszek Zabłocki, comic dramatist and satirist
- Janusz A. Zajdel, science-fiction writer
- Gabriela Zapolska, novelist
- Rafał A. Ziemkiewicz, political fiction and science-fiction writer
- Aleksandra Ziolkowska-Boehm, writer
- Antonina Żabińska, writer
- Stefan Żeromski, novelist
- Jerzy Żuławski, novelist
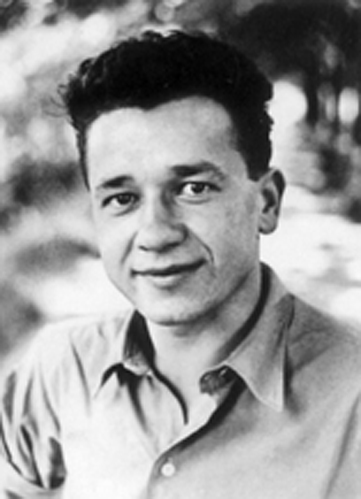
Borowski

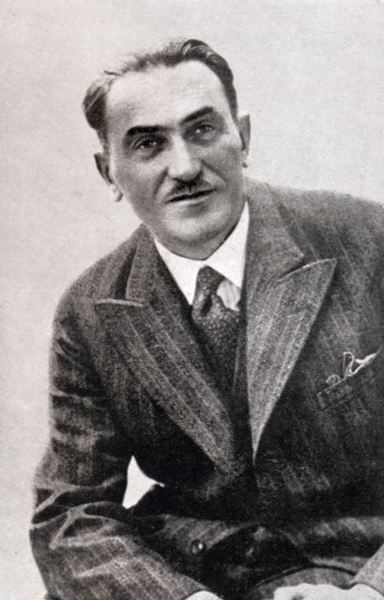
Boy-Żeleński

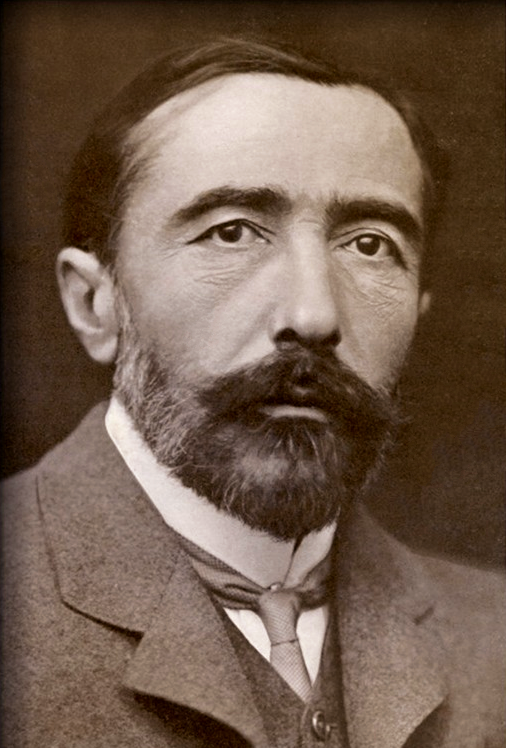
Conrad

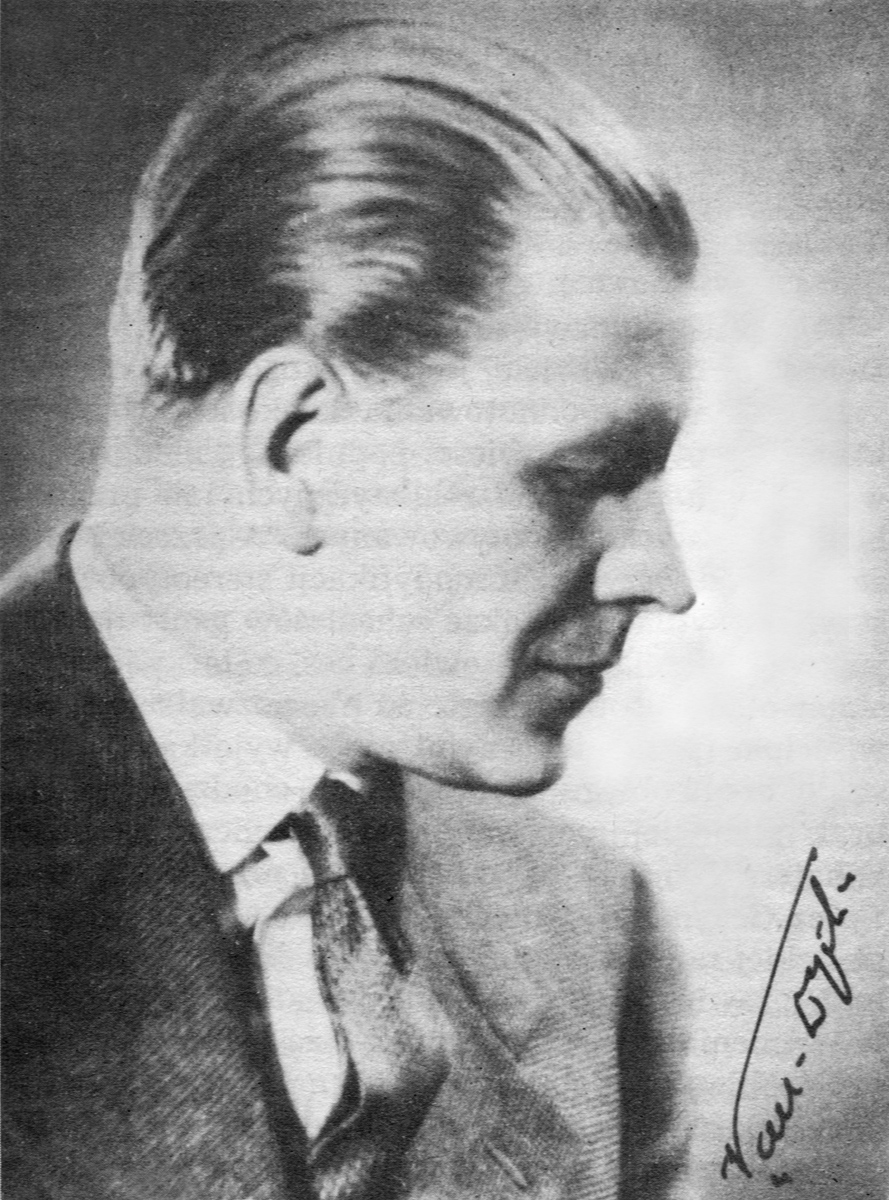
Dołęga-Mostowicz

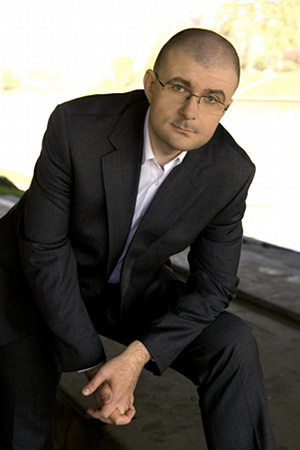
Dukaj

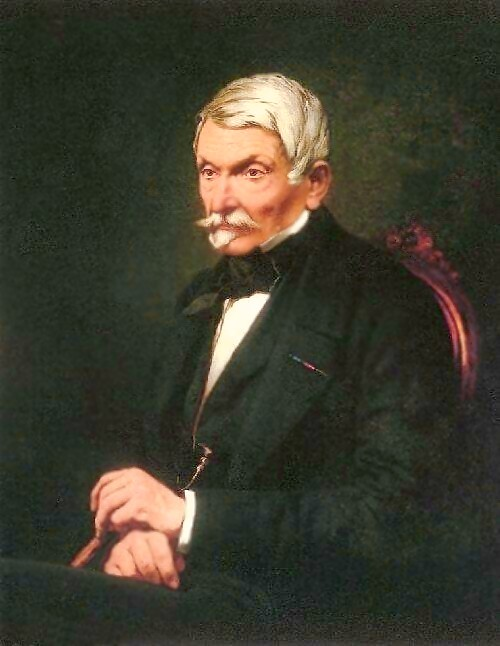
Fredro

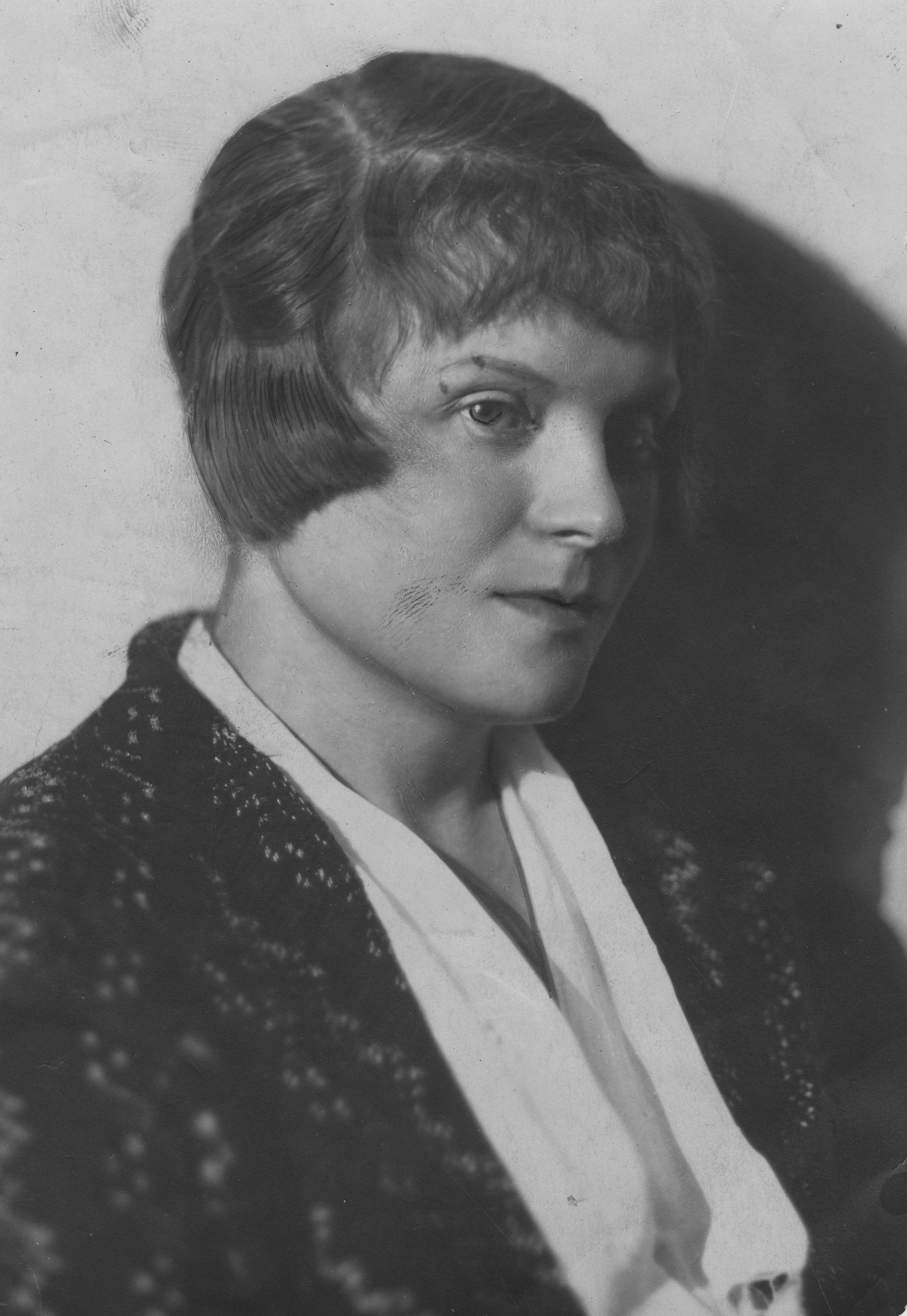
Dąbrowska

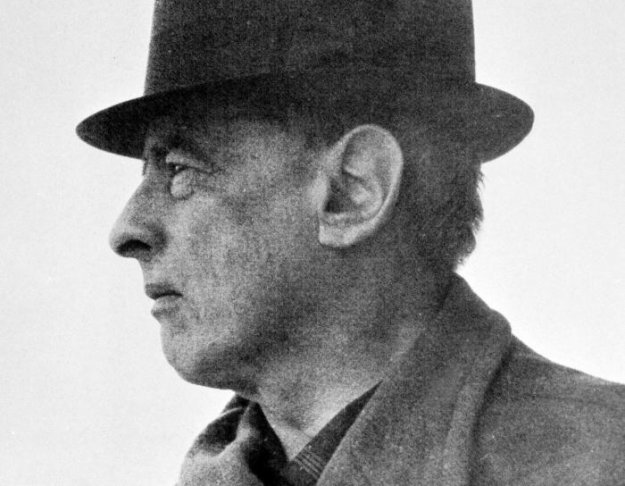
Gombrowicz

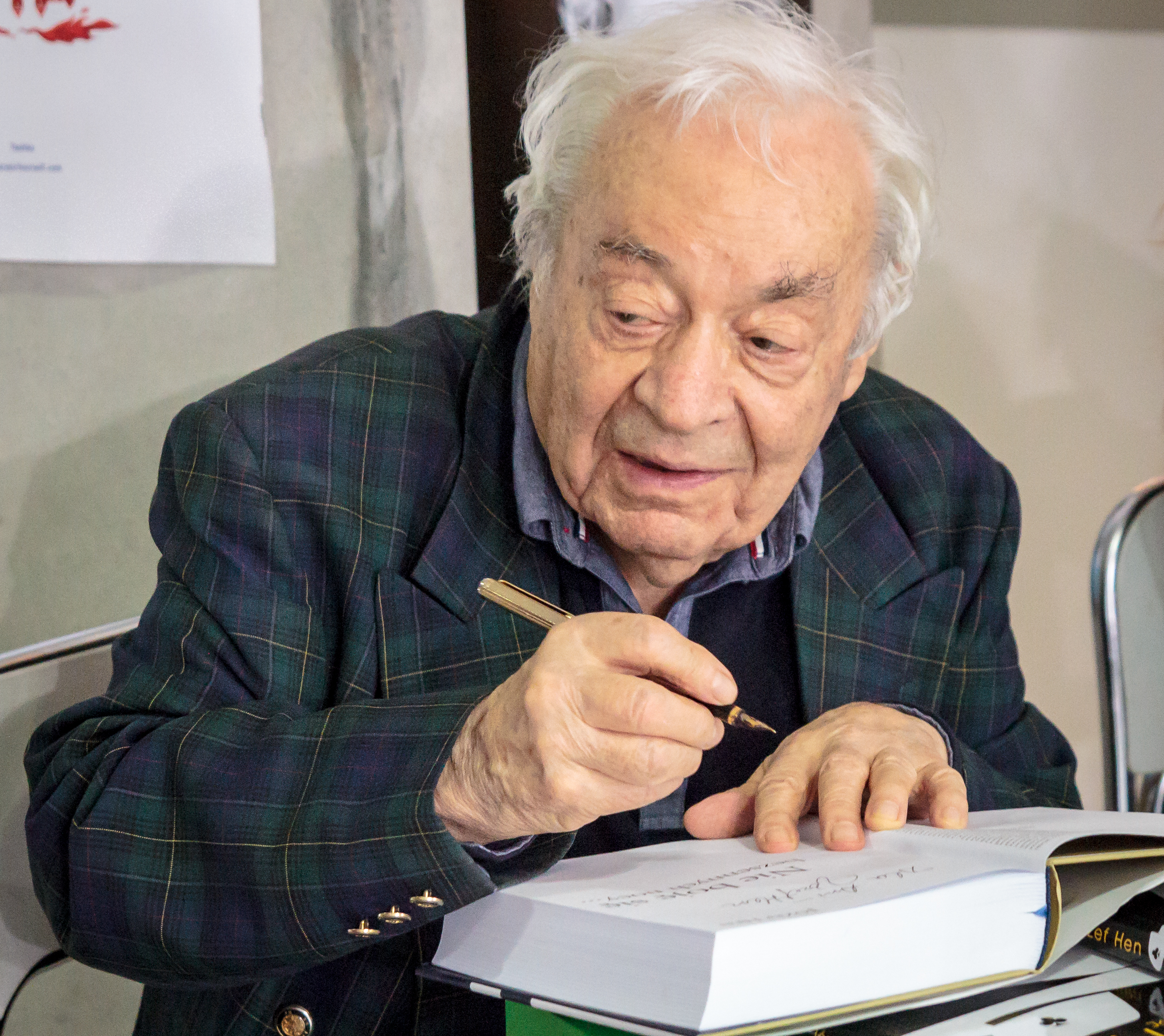
Hen

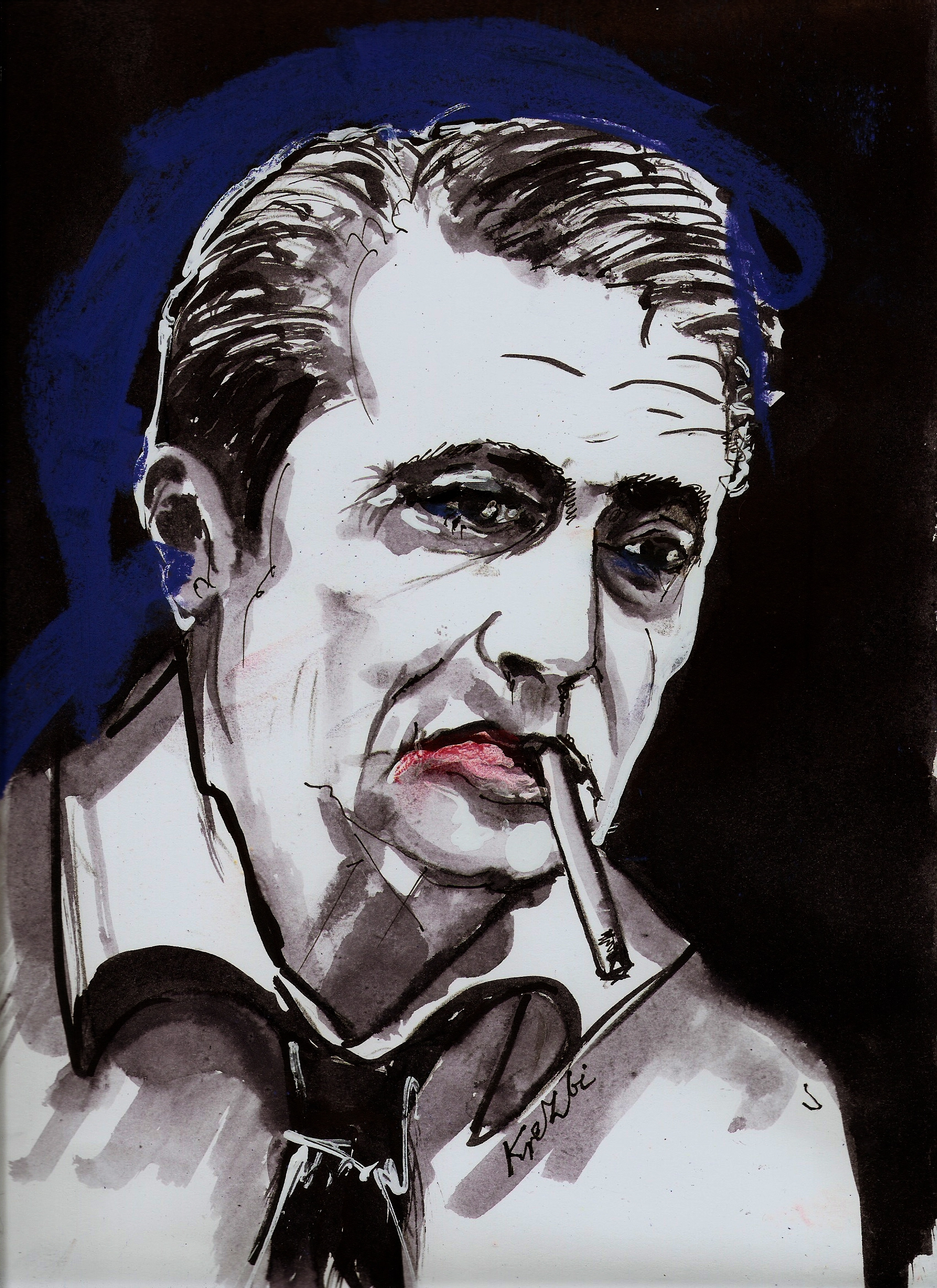
Hłasko

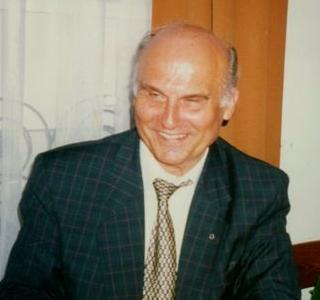
Kapuściński

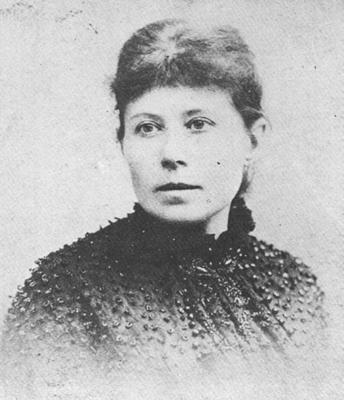
Konopnicka

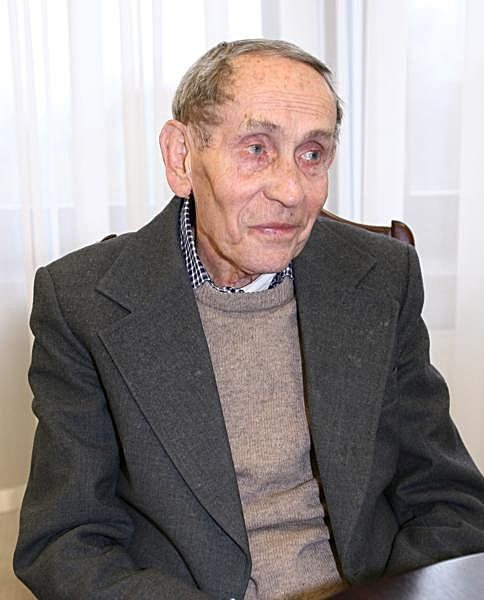
Konwicki

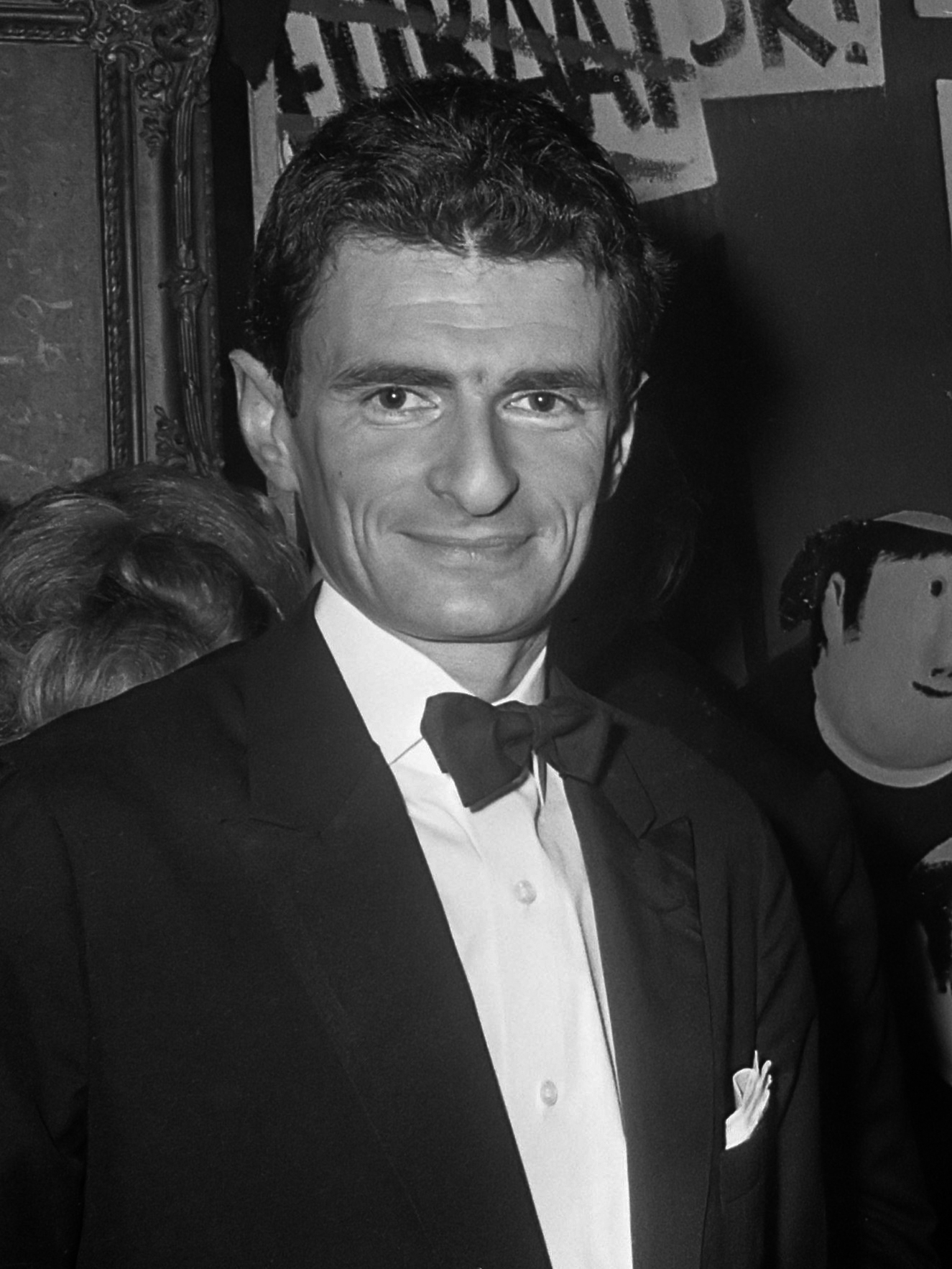
Kosiński

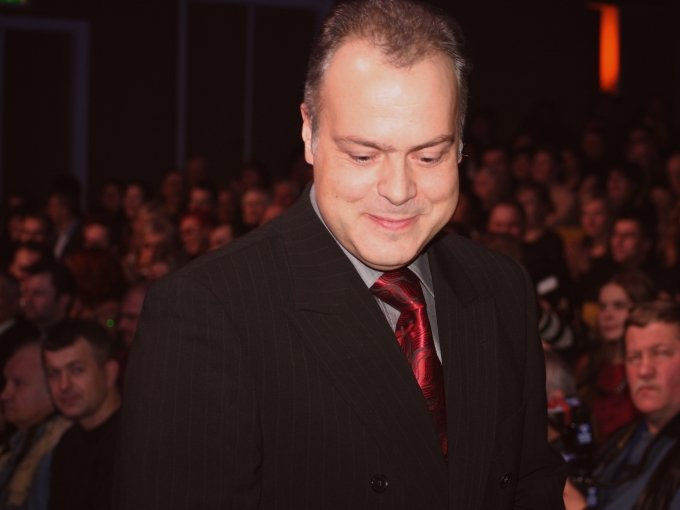
Krajewski

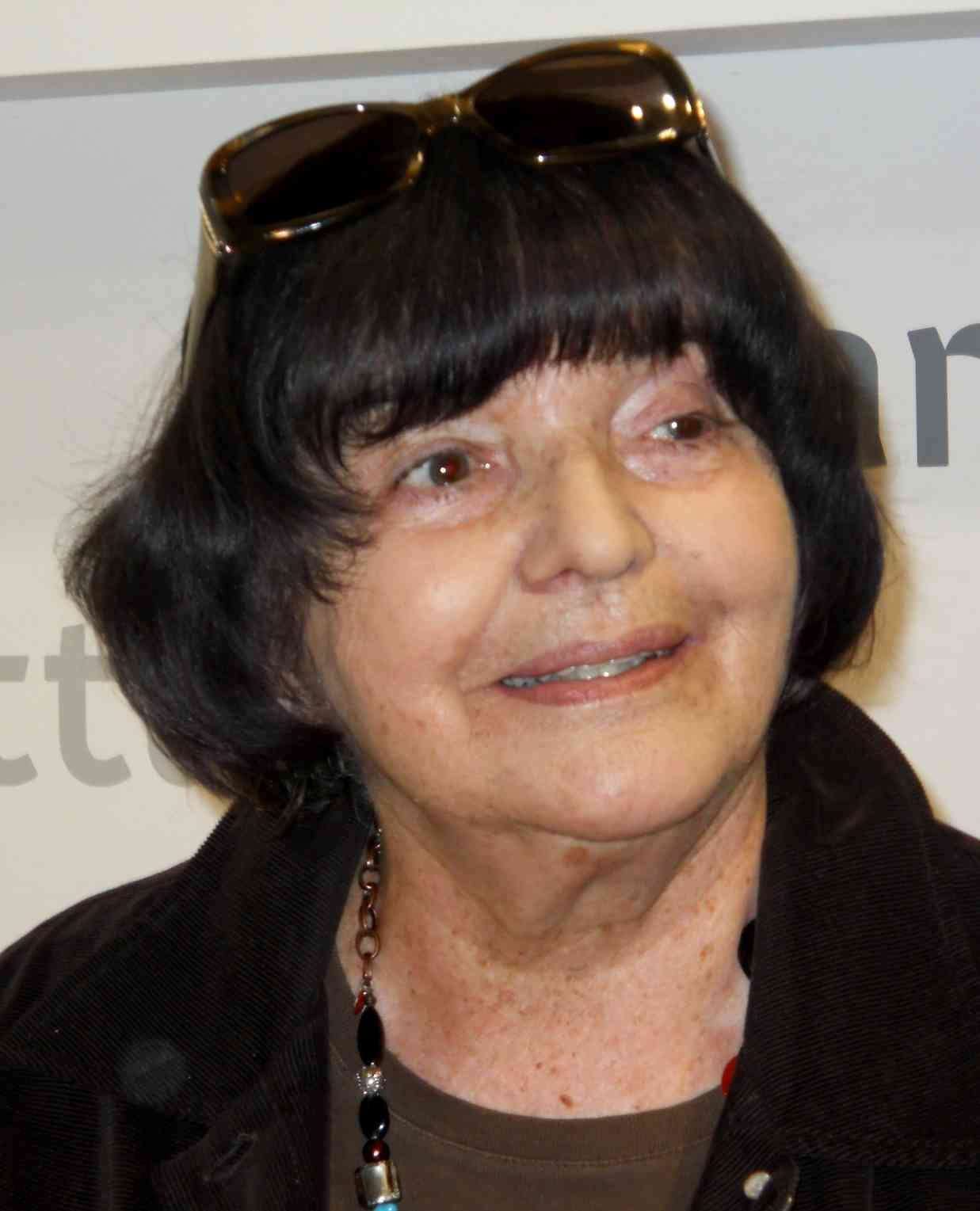
Krall

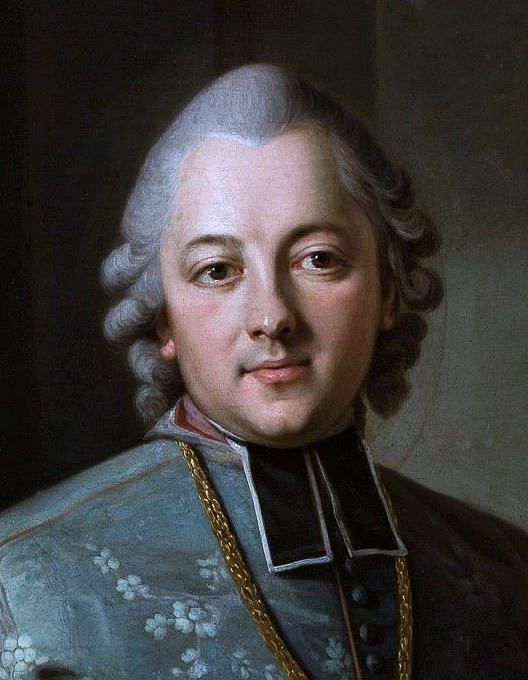
Krasicki

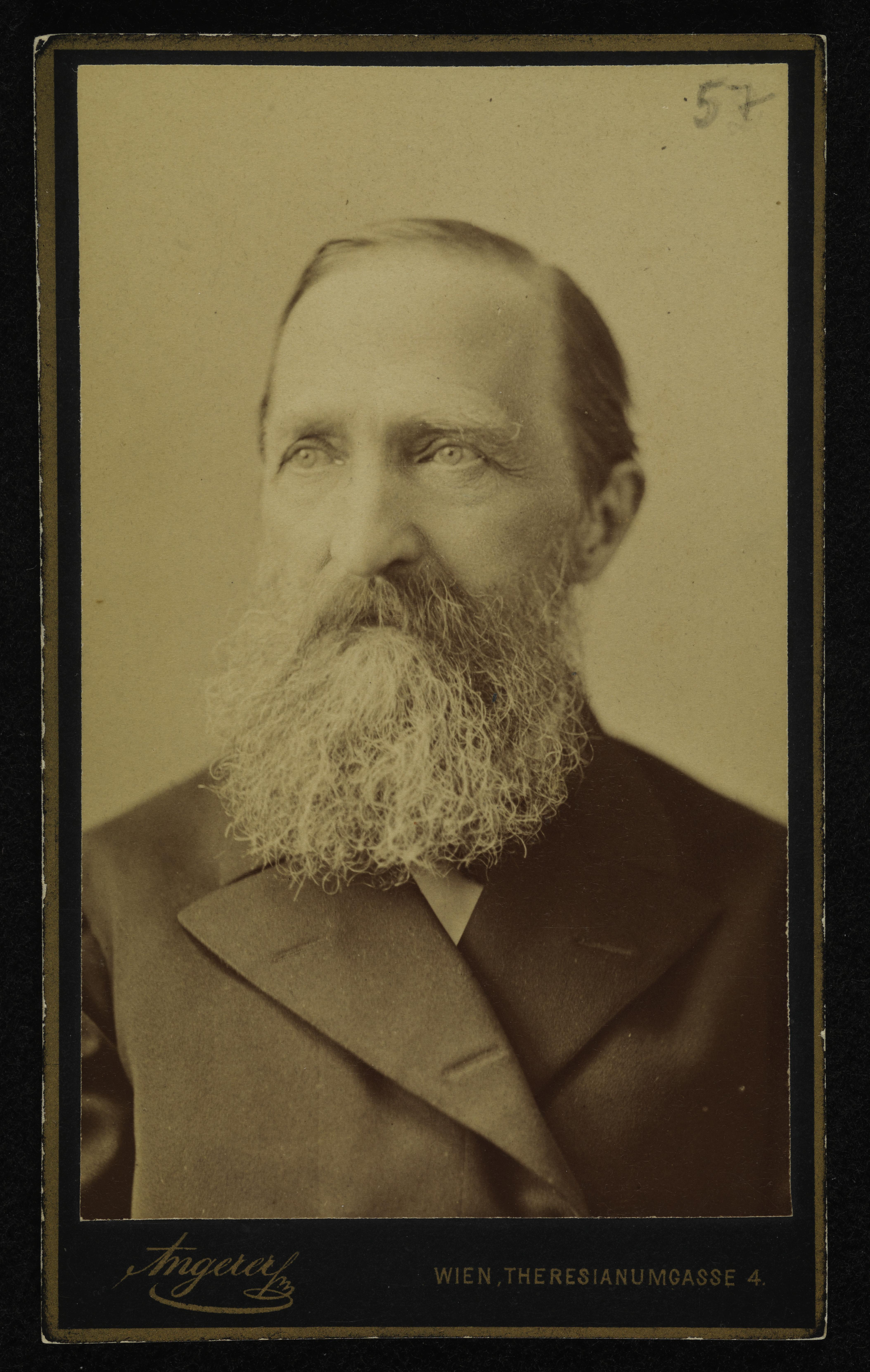
Kraszewski

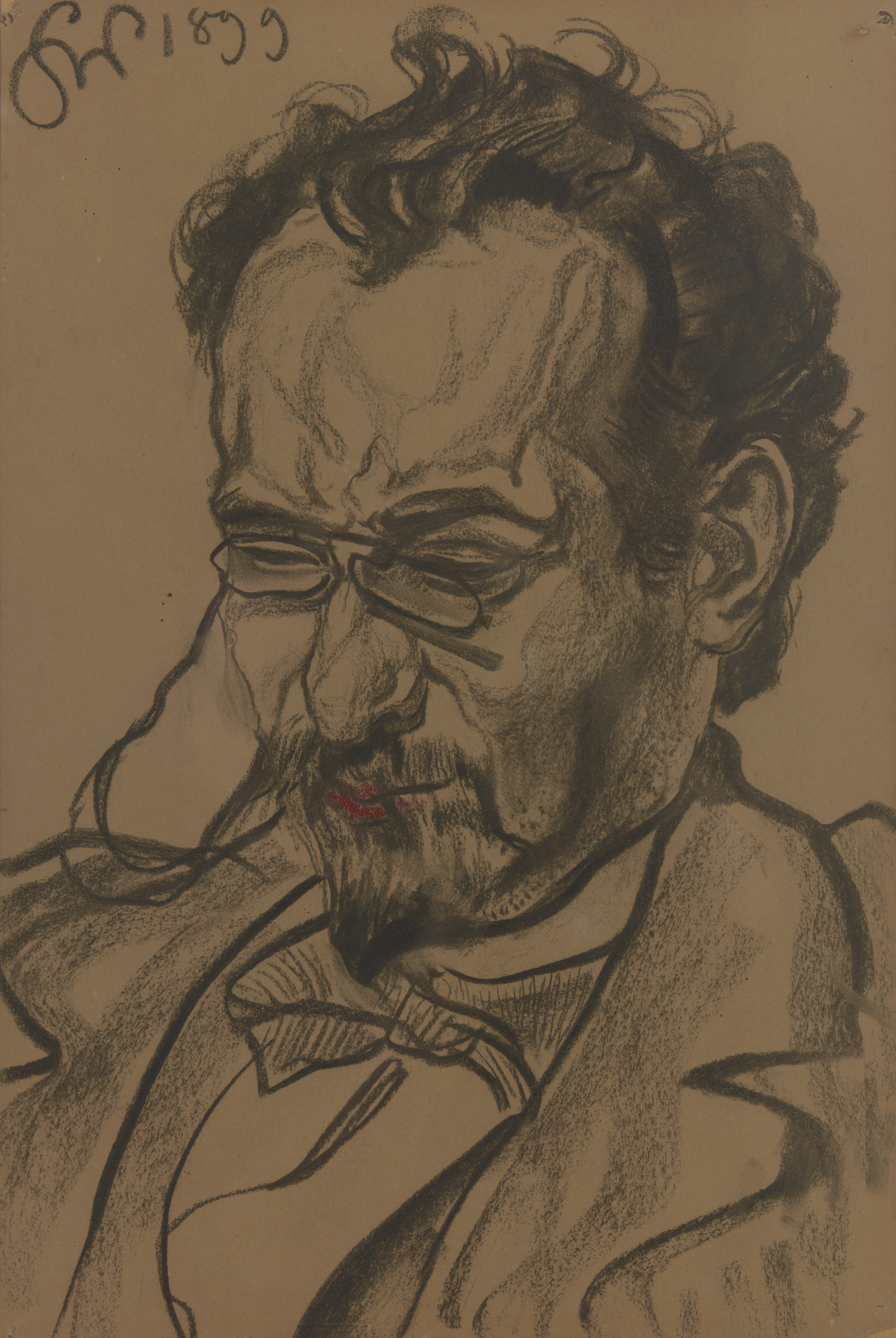
Lange

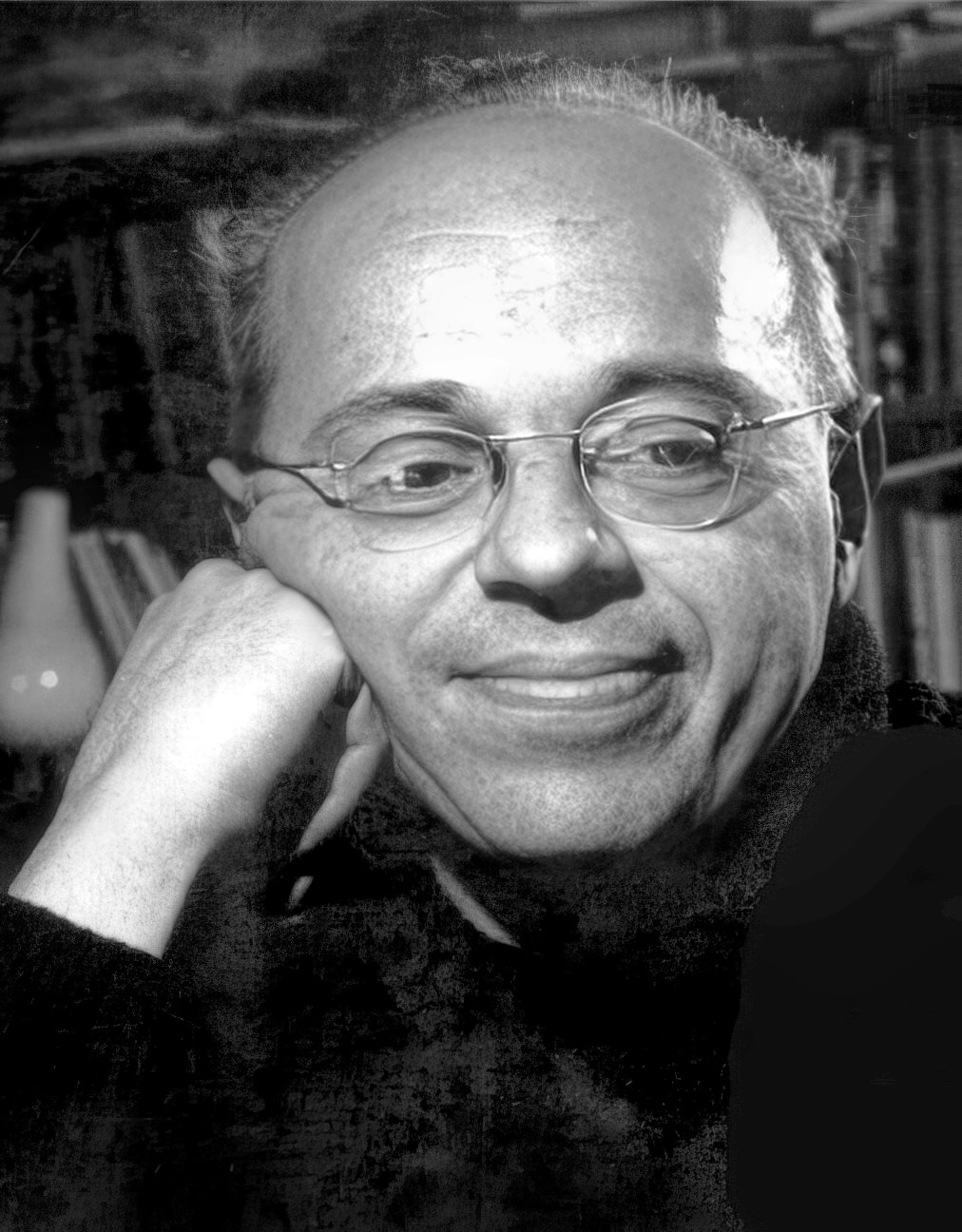
Lem

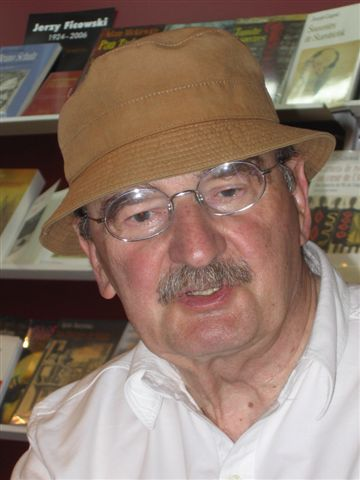
Mrożek

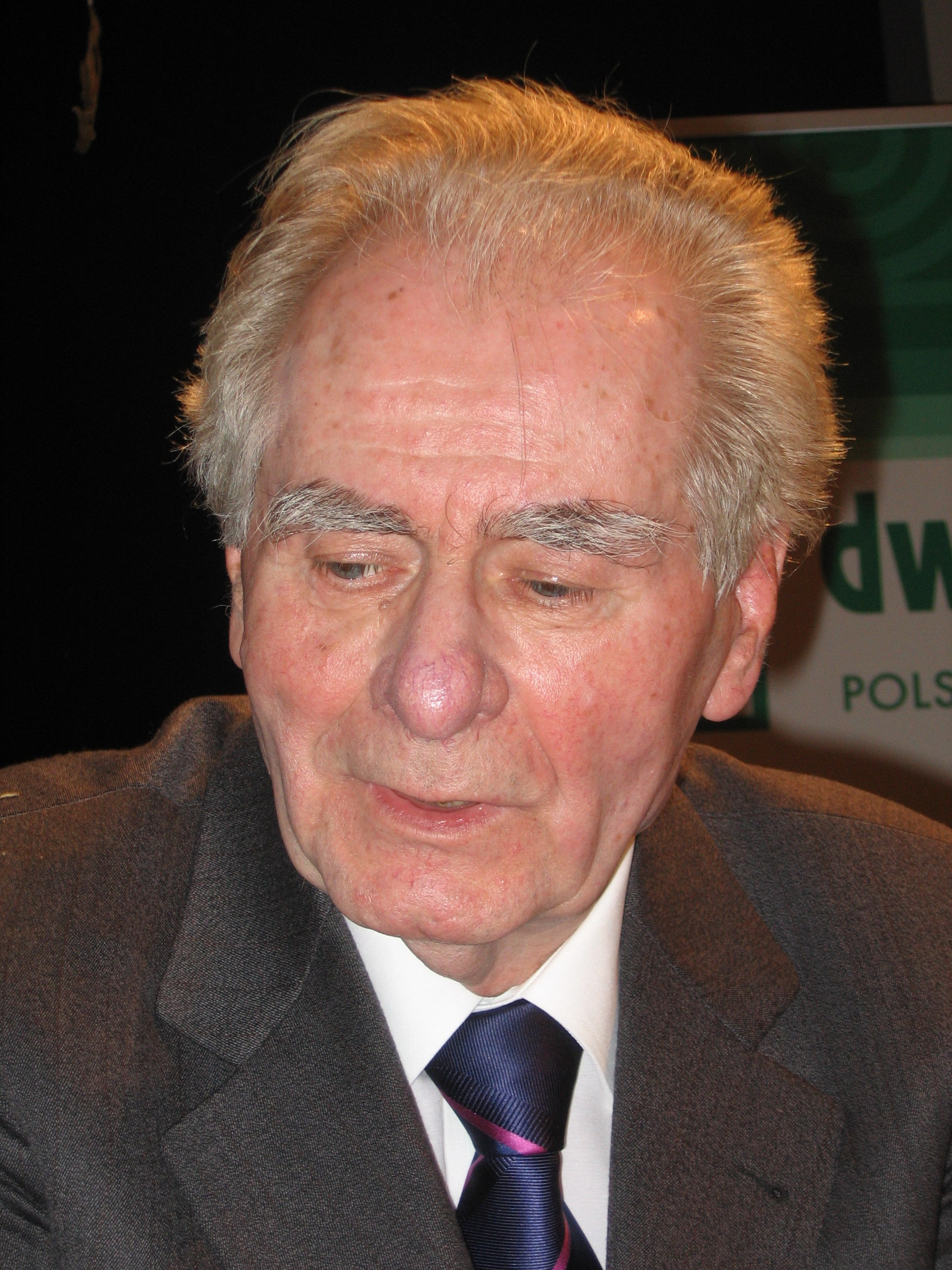
Myśliwski

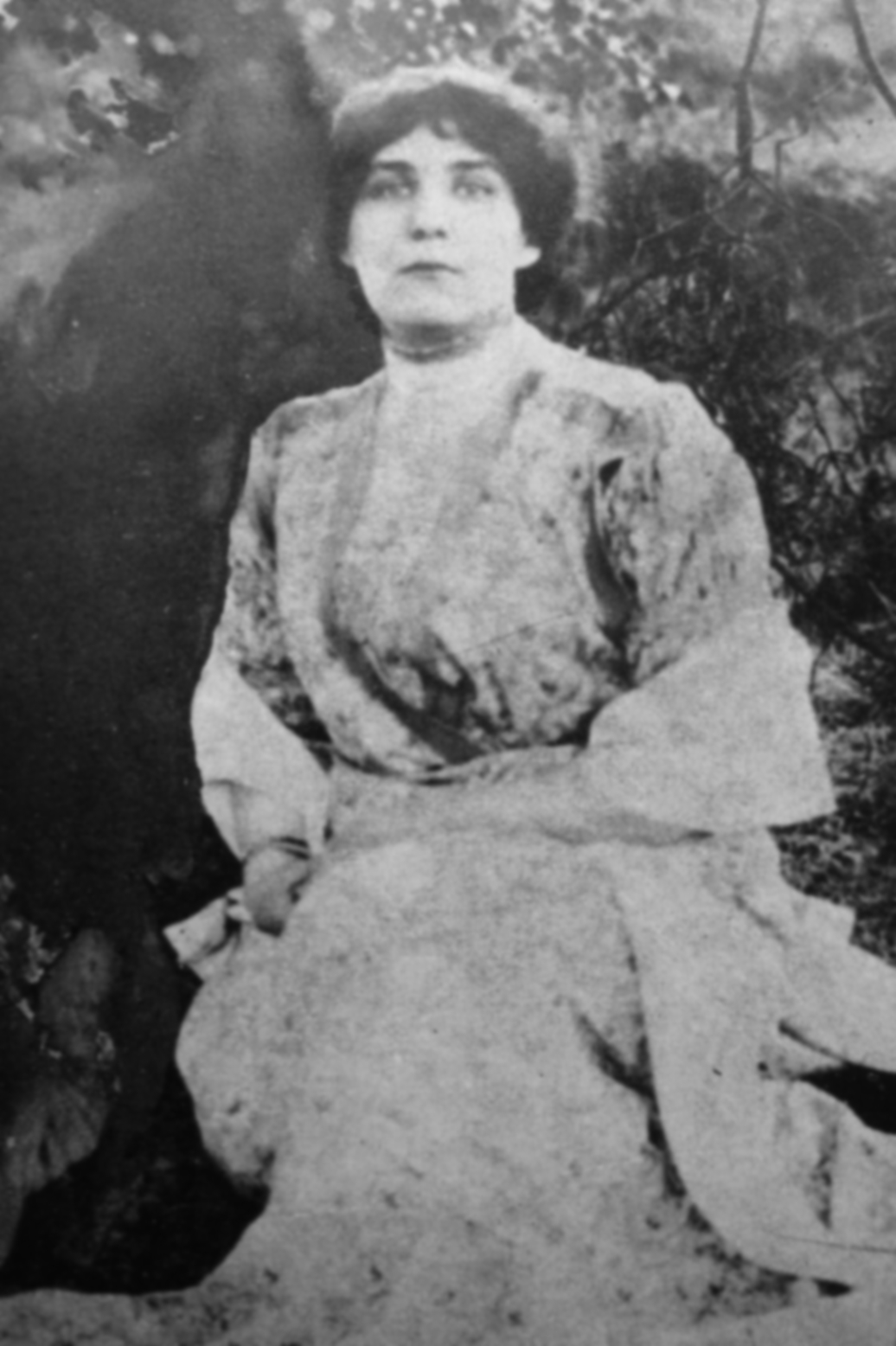
Nałkowska

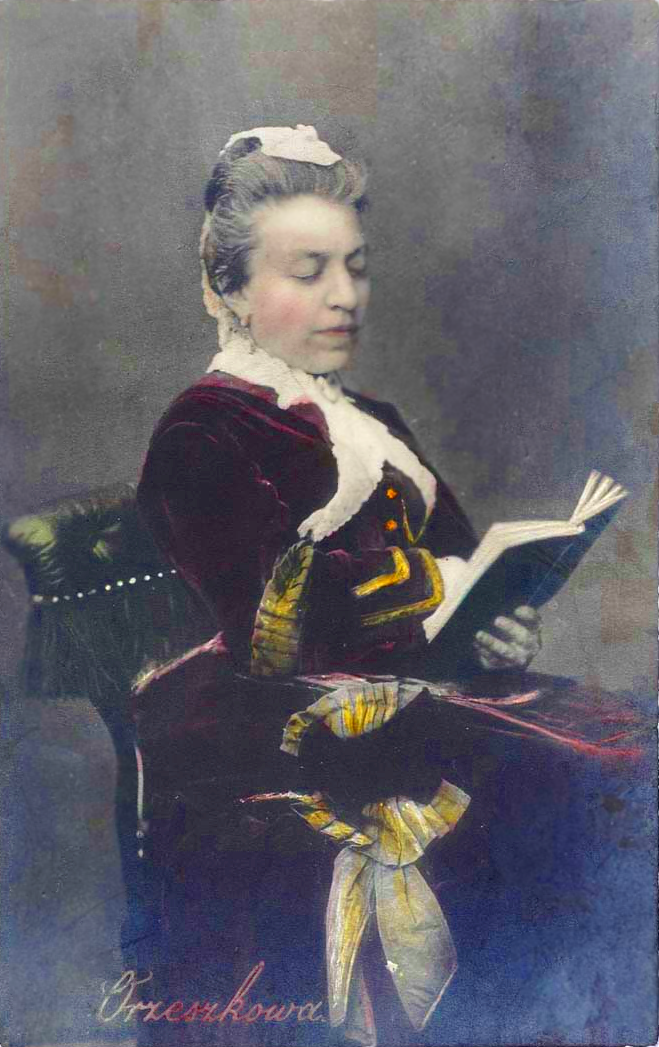
Orzeszkowa

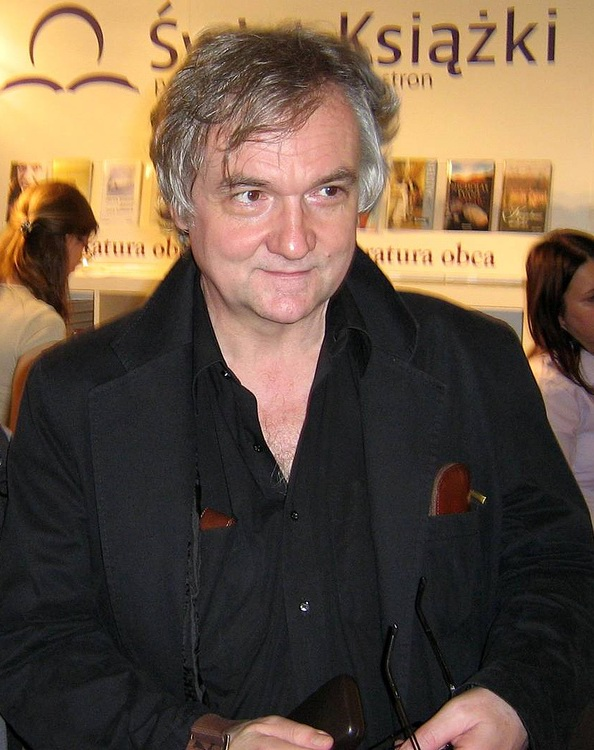
Pilch

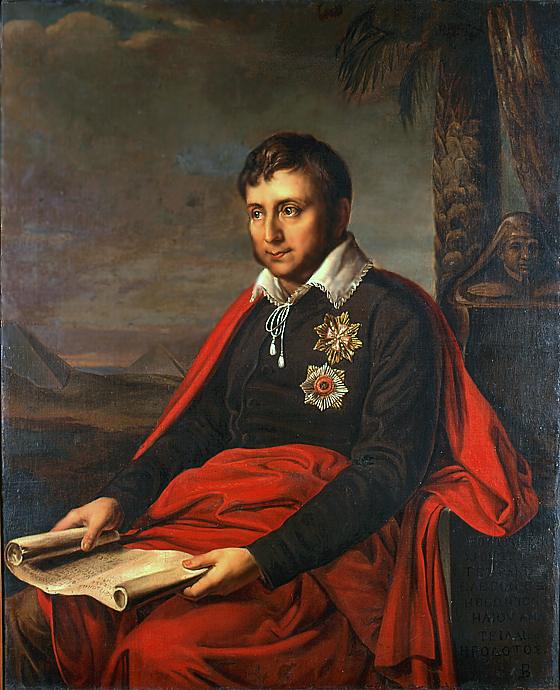
Potocki

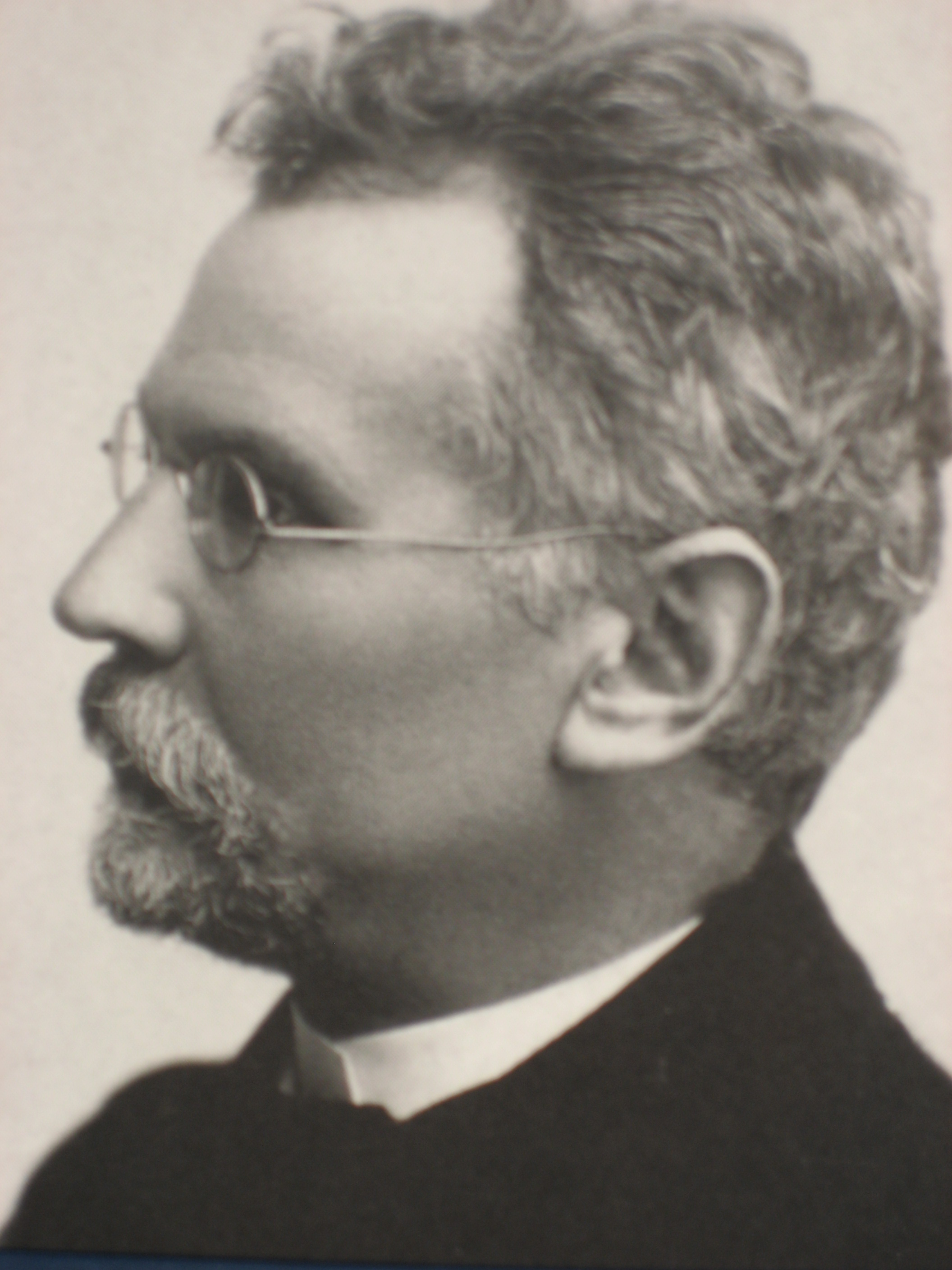
Prus

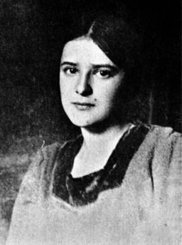
Przybyszewska

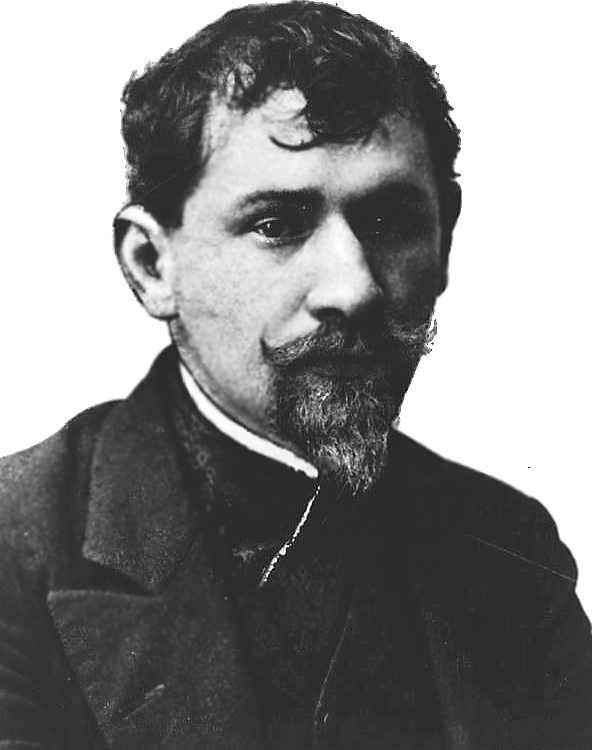
Przybyszewski

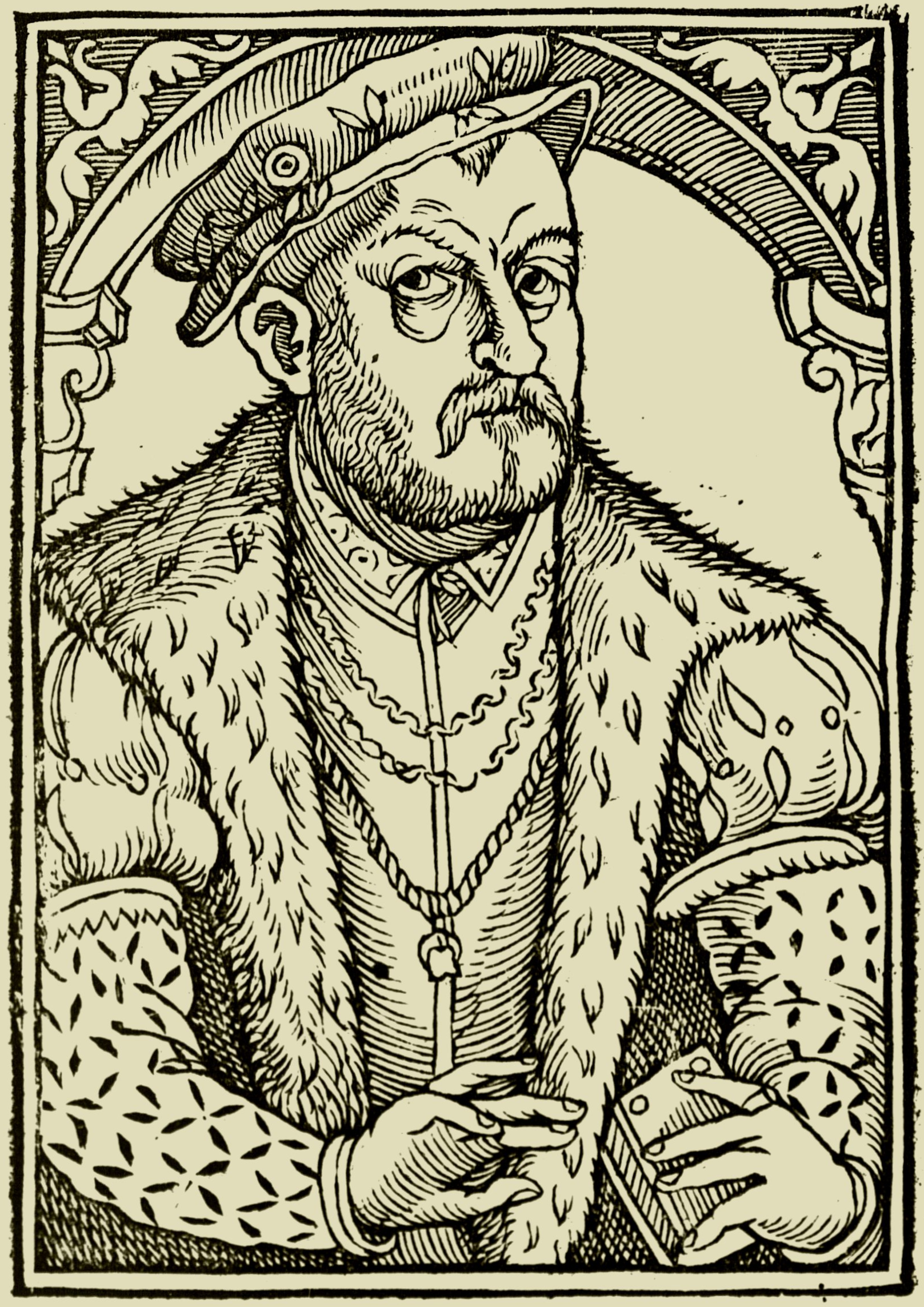
Rej

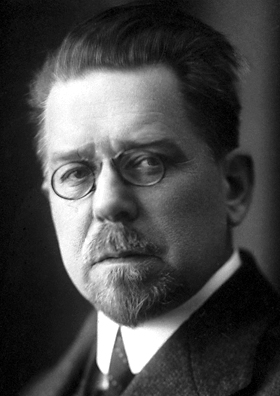
Reymont

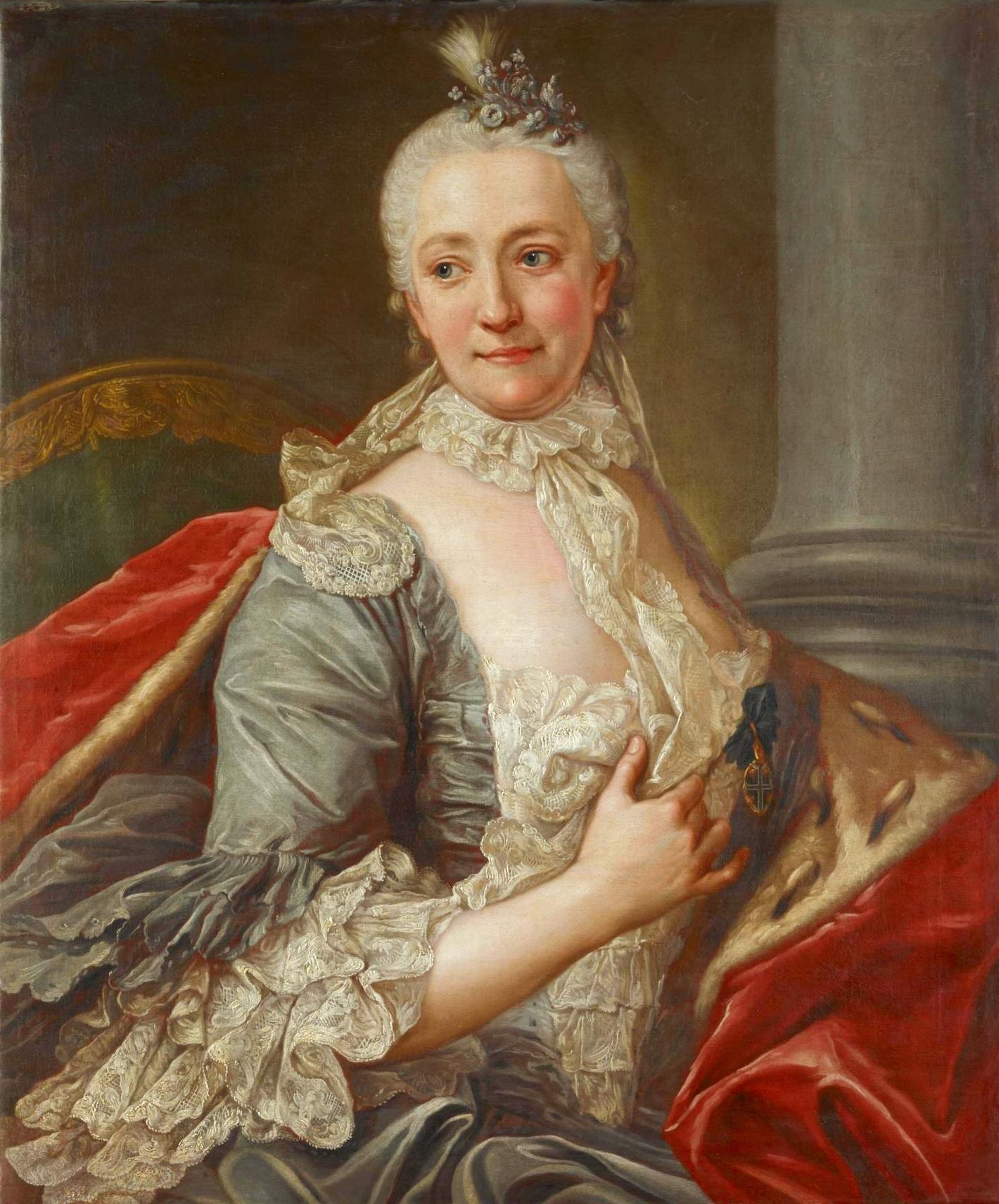
Sanguszko

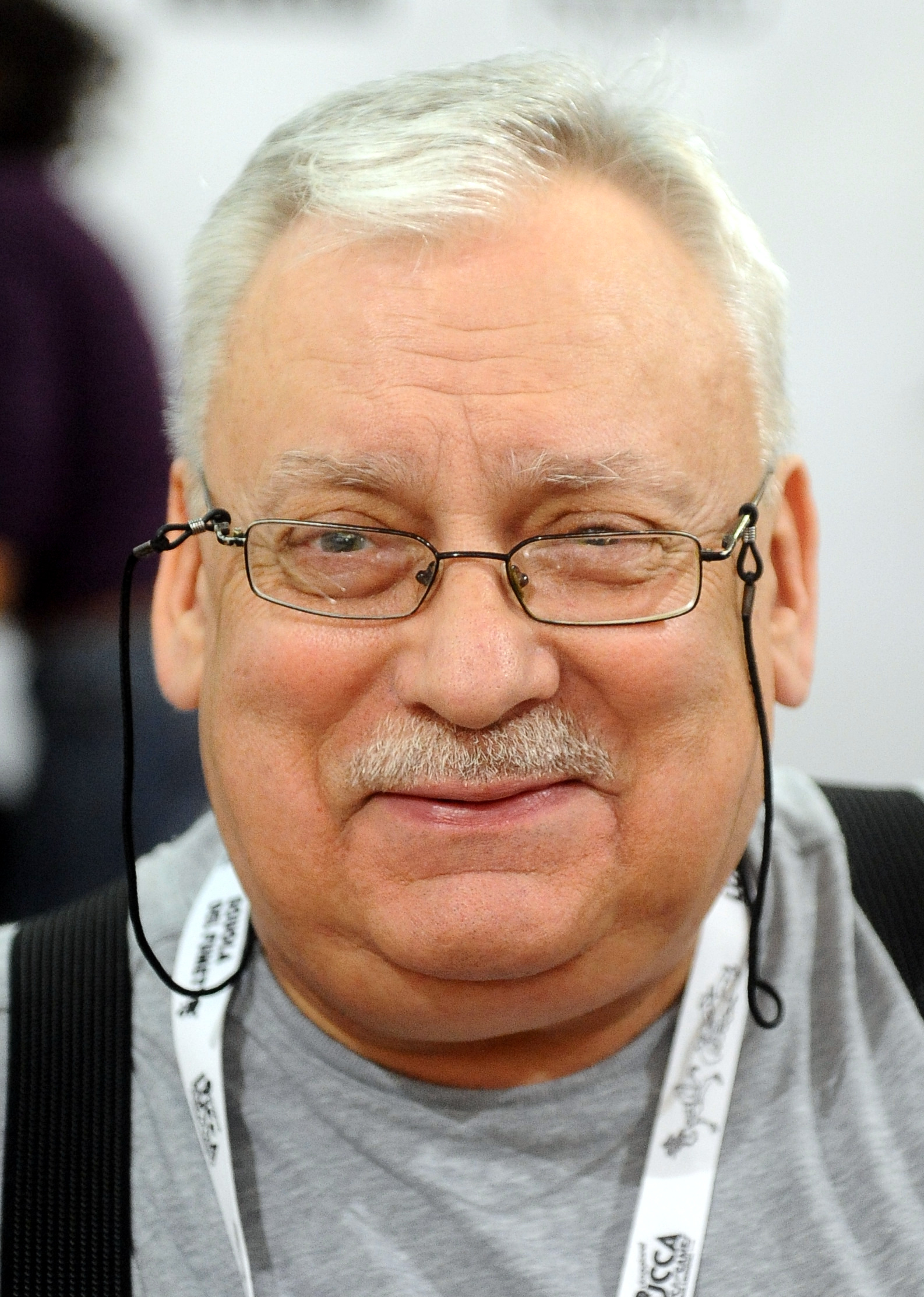
Sapkowski

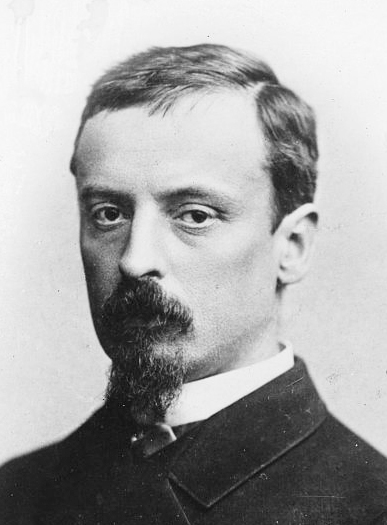
Sienkiewicz

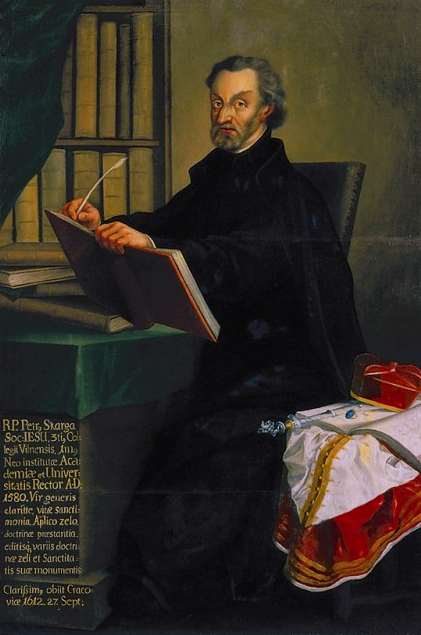
Skarga

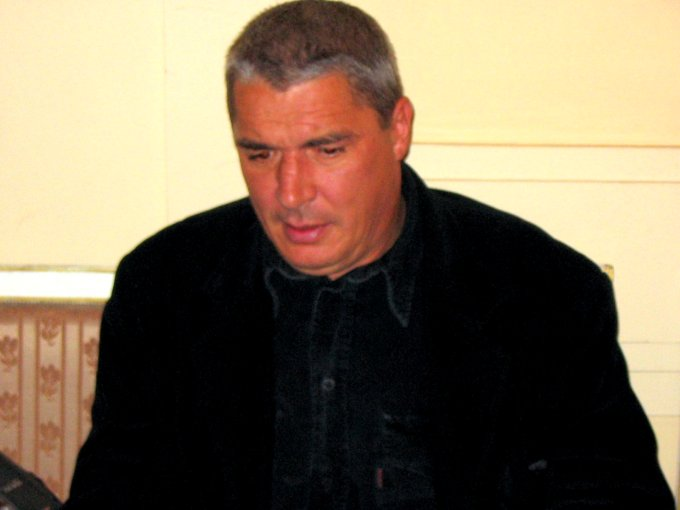
Stasiuk

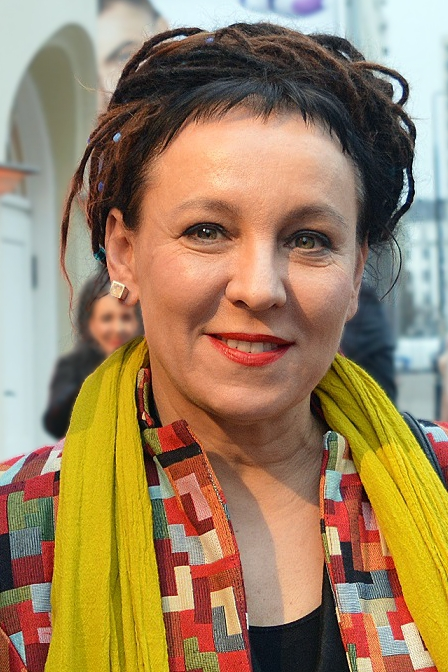
Tokarczuk

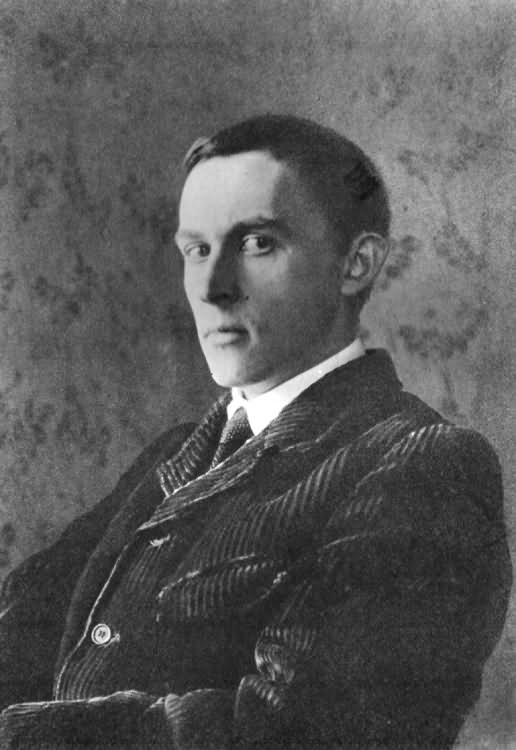
Witkiewicz

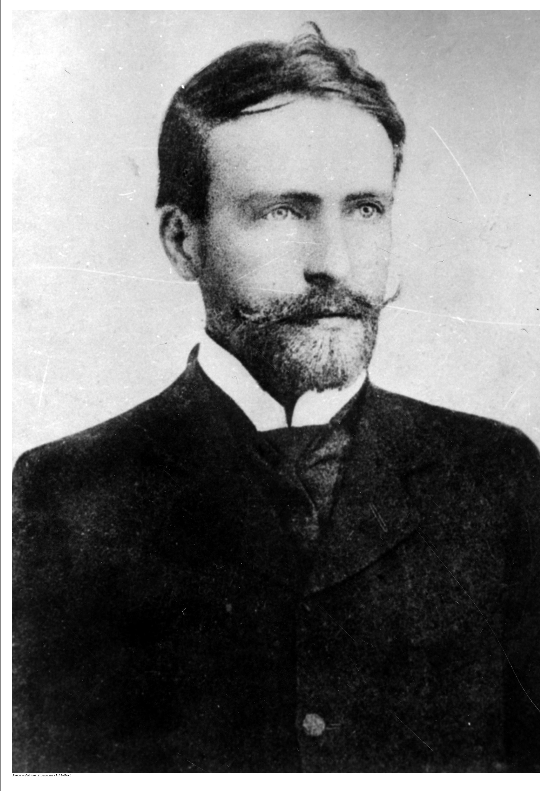
Wyspiański

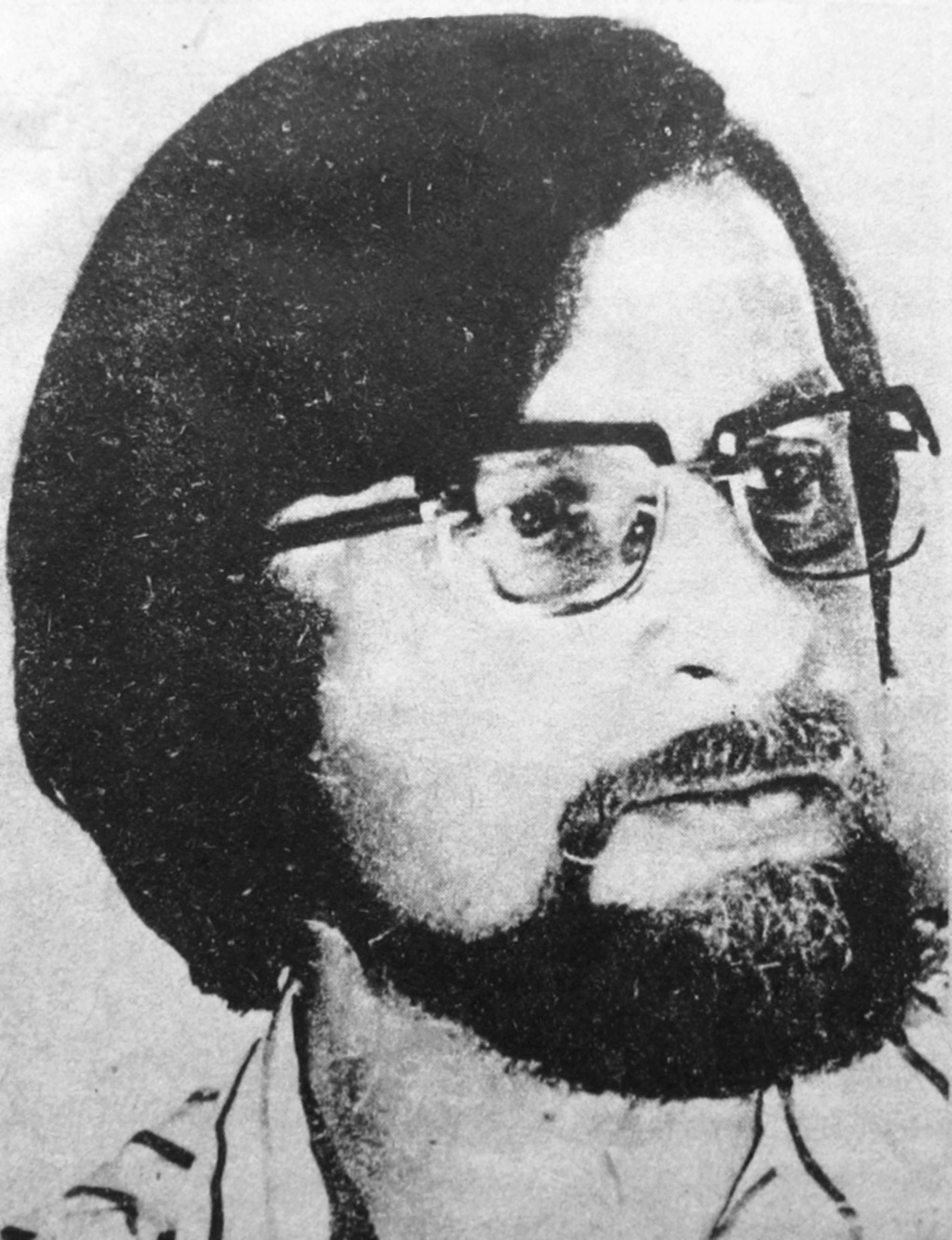
Zajdel

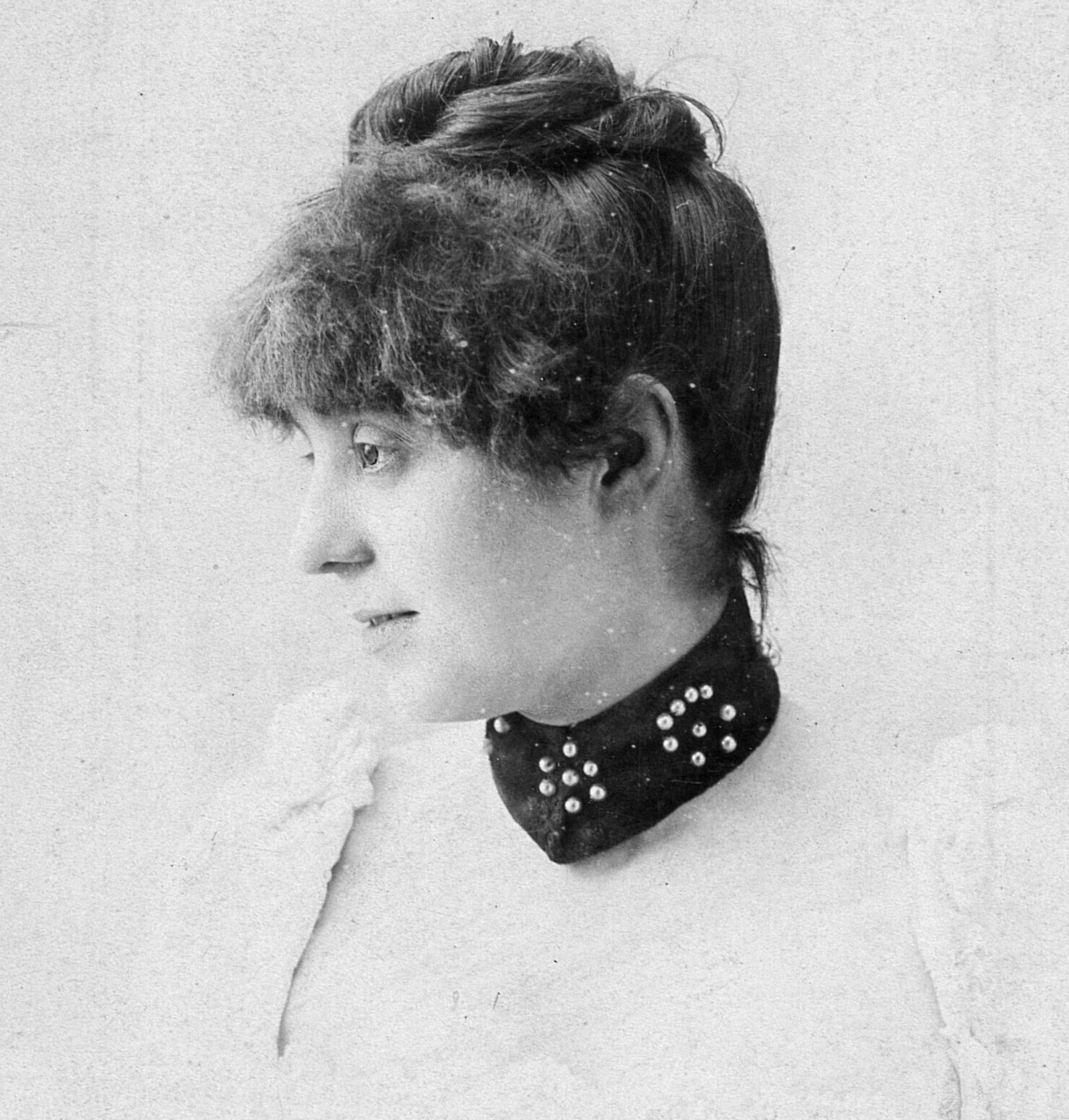
Zapolska

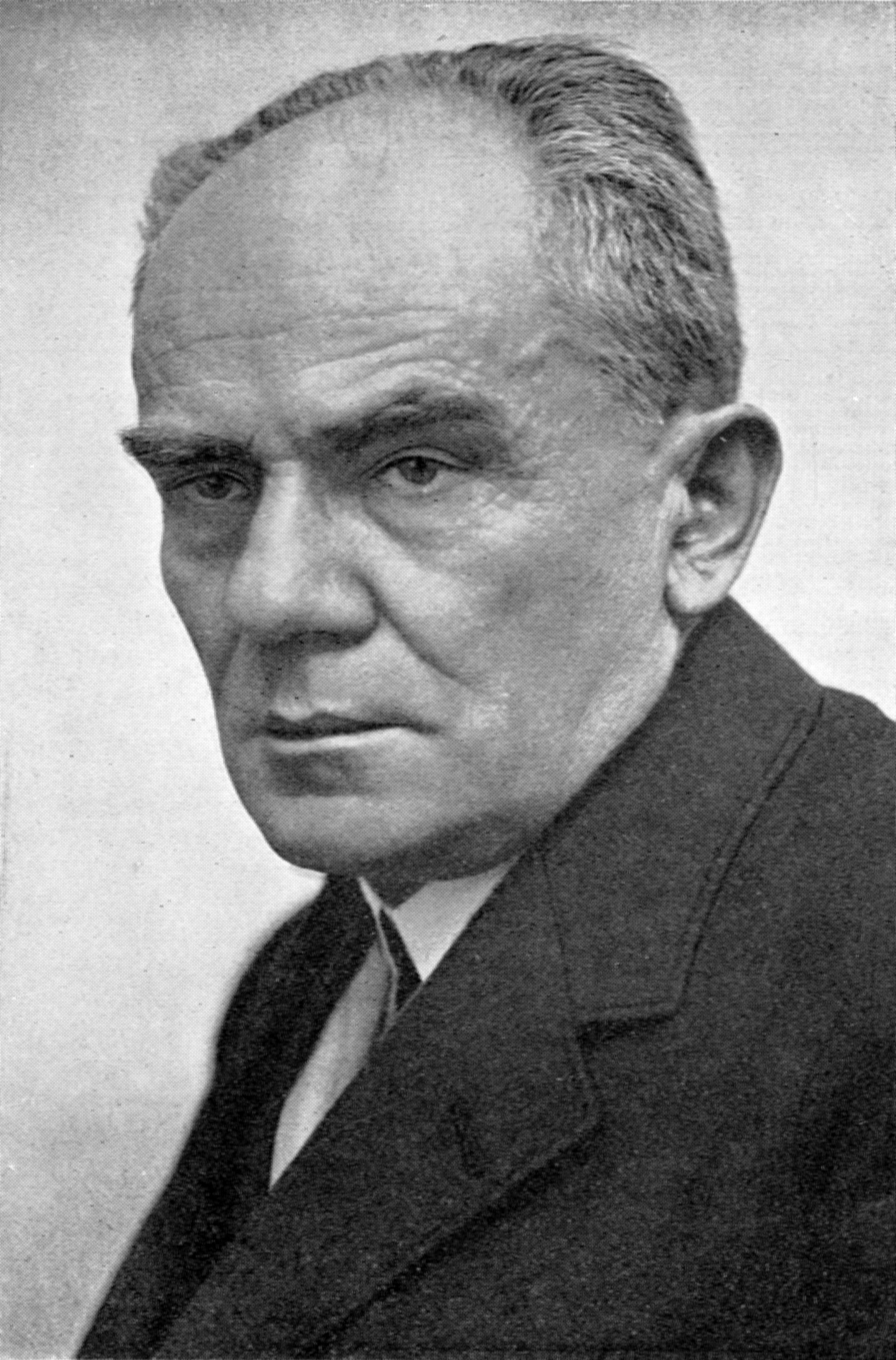
Żeromski

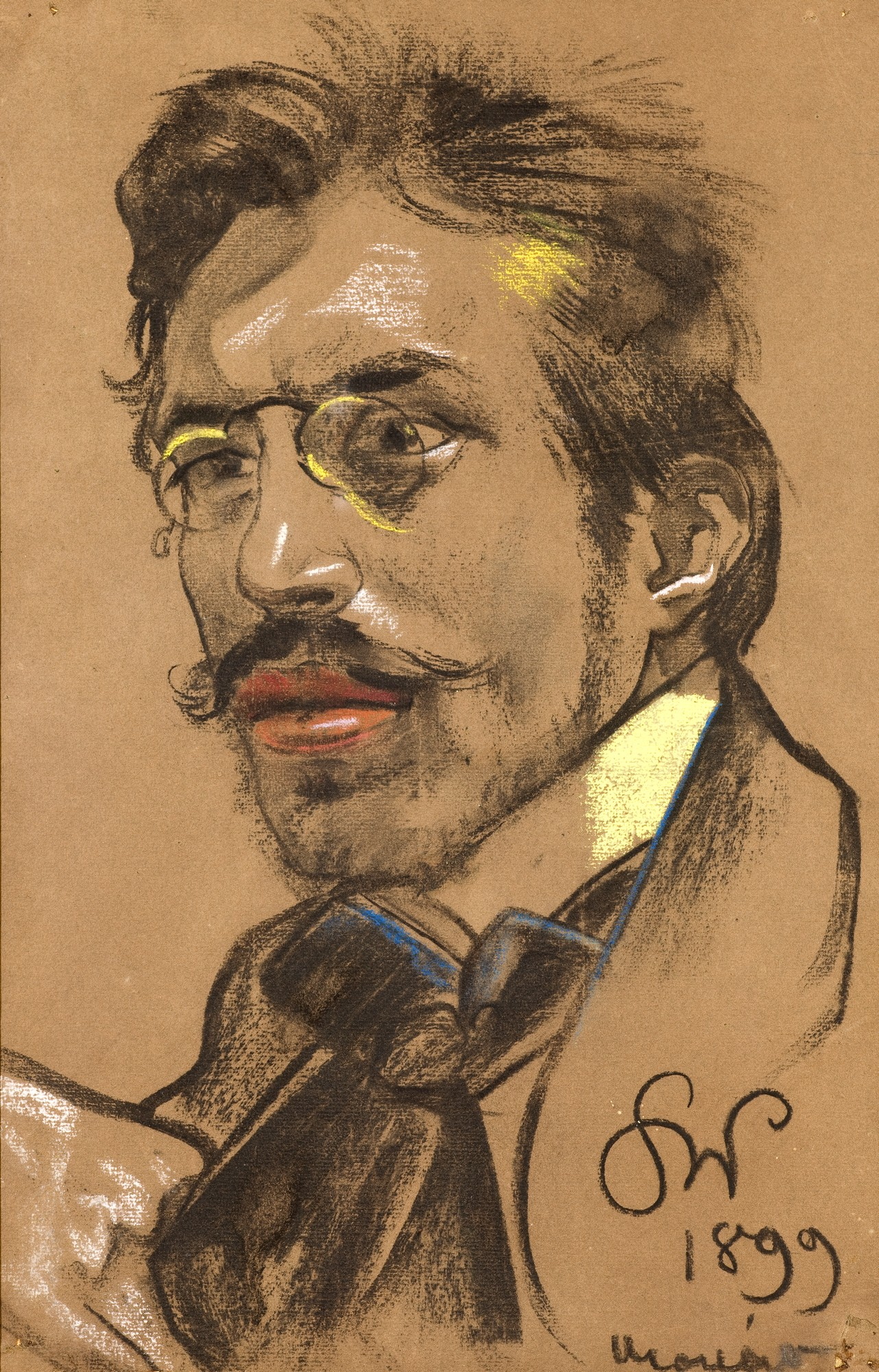
Żuławski

== Poetry ==
- Guillaume Apollinaire, (Wilhelm Apolinary Kostrowicki)
- Franciszka Arnsztajnowa
- Adam Asnyk
- Krzysztof Kamil Baczyński
- Edward Balcerzan
- Stanisław Barańczak
- Miron Białoszewski
- Zbigniew Bieńkowski
- Biernat of Lublin
- Tadeusz Borowski
- Władysław Broniewski
- Jan Brzechwa
- Stanisław Korab-Brzozowski
- Teodor Bujnicki
- Andrzej Bursa
- Tytus Czyżewski
- Jacek Dehnel
- Elżbieta Drużbacka
- Leszek Engelking
- Jerzy Ficowski
- Aleksander Fredro
- Tadeusz Gajcy
- Konstanty Ildefons Gałczyński
- Zuzanna Ginczanka
- Stanisław Grochowiak
- Julia Hartwig
- Marian Hemar
- Zbigniew Herbert
- Kazimiera Iłłakowiczówna
- Wacław Iwaniuk
- Jarosław Iwaszkiewicz
- Klemens Janicki
- Bruno Jasieński
- Anna Kamieńska
- Franciszek Karpiński
- Jan Kasprowicz
- Jan Kochanowski
- Feliks Konarski
- Maria Konopnicka
- Julian Kornhauser
- Urszula Kozioł
- Ignacy Krasicki
- Zygmunt Krasiński
- Andrzej Krzycki
- Paweł Kubisz
- Jalu Kurek
- Stanisław Jerzy Lec
- Jan Lechoń
- Bolesław Leśmian
- Ewa Lipska
- Henryka Łazowertówna
- Tadeusz Miciński
- Adam Mickiewicz
- Grazyna Miller, translation
- Czesław Miłosz, 1980 Nobel Prize in Literature
- Andrzej Frycz Modrzewski, humanism
- Jan Andrzej Morsztyn
- Zbigniew Morsztyn
- Daniel Naborowski
- Adam Naruszewicz, translation, history
- Julian Ursyn Niemcewicz
- Cyprian Kamil Norwid
- Franciszek Nowicki
- Beata Obertyńska
- Antoni Edward Odyniec
- Artur Oppman
- Władysław Orkan
- Agnieszka Osiecka
- Maria Pawlikowska-Jasnorzewska
- Jacek Podsiadło
- Wincenty Pol
- Wacław Potocki
- Halina Poświatowska
- Zenon Przesmycki
- Jeremi Przybora, songs
- Julian Przyboś
- Mikołaj Rej
- Sydor Rey
- Tadeusz Różewicz
- Zygmunt Rumel
- Lucjan Rydel
- Jarosław Marek Rymkiewicz
- Maciej Kazimierz Sarbiewski
- Antoni Słonimski
- Juliusz Słowacki
- Edward Stachura
- Anna Stanisławska
- Anatol Stern
- Leopold Staff
- Xawery Stańczyk, poet, sociologist
- Władysław Szlengel, Jewish-Polish poet and lyricist killed in the Warsaw Ghetto Uprising
- Włodzimierz Szymanowicz
- Wisława Szymborska, 1996 Nobel Prize in Literature
- Szymon Szymonowic
- Marcin Świetlicki
- Bolesław Taborski, translator of Pope John Paul II into English, BBC editor
- Kazimierz Przerwa-Tetmajer
- Eugeniusz Tkaczyszyn-Dycki
- Julian Tuwim
- Jan Twardowski
- Kornel Ujejski
- Bronisława Wajs, aka "Papusza", Polska Roma poet and singer
- Aleksander Wat
- Kazimierz Wierzyński
- Stefan Witwicki
- Rafał Wojaczek
- Stanisław Wyspiański
- Tymon Zaborowski
- Adam Zagajewski
- Józef Bohdan Zaleski
- Kazimiera Zawistowska
- Piotr Zbylitowski
- Emil Zegadłowicz
- Juliusz Żuławski
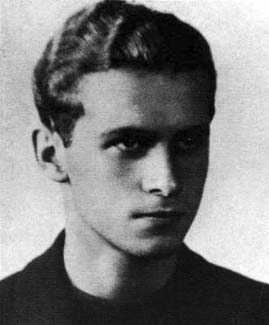
Baczyński

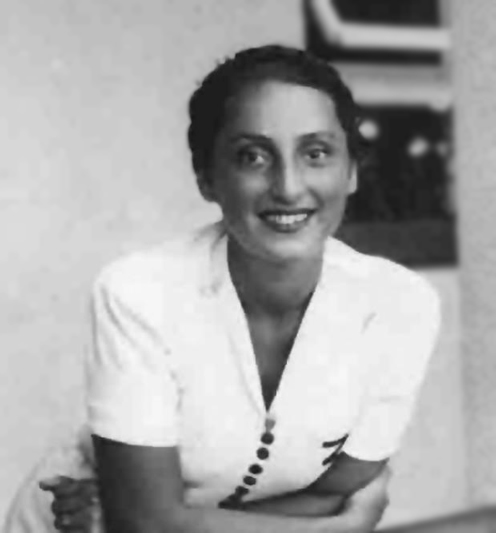
Ginczanka

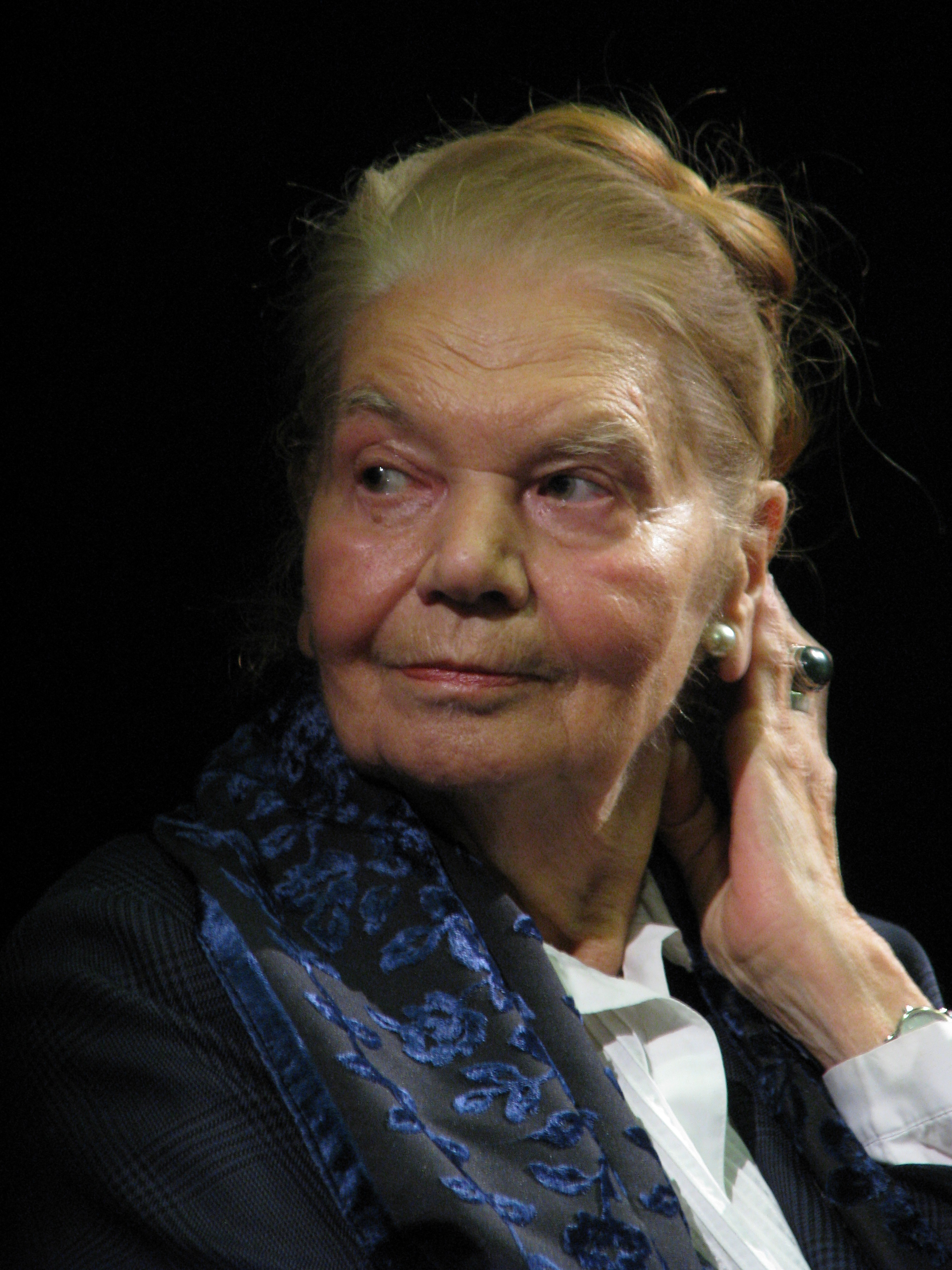
Hartwig

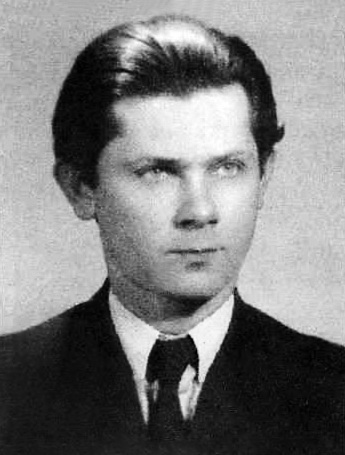
Herbert

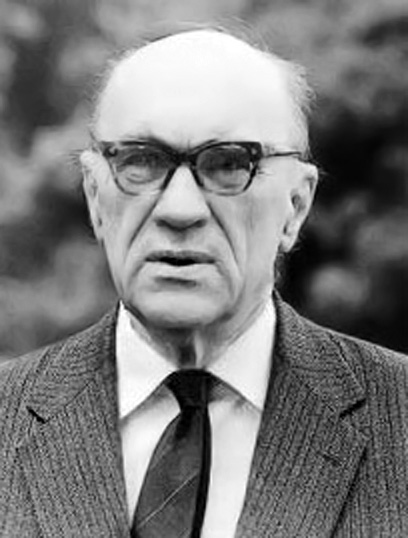
Iwaszkiewicz

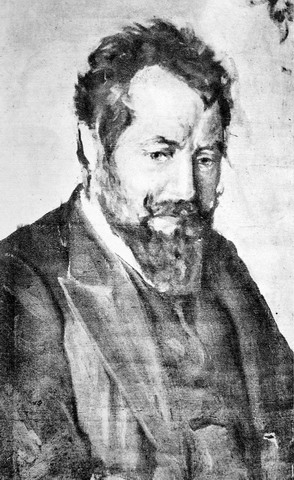
Kasprowicz

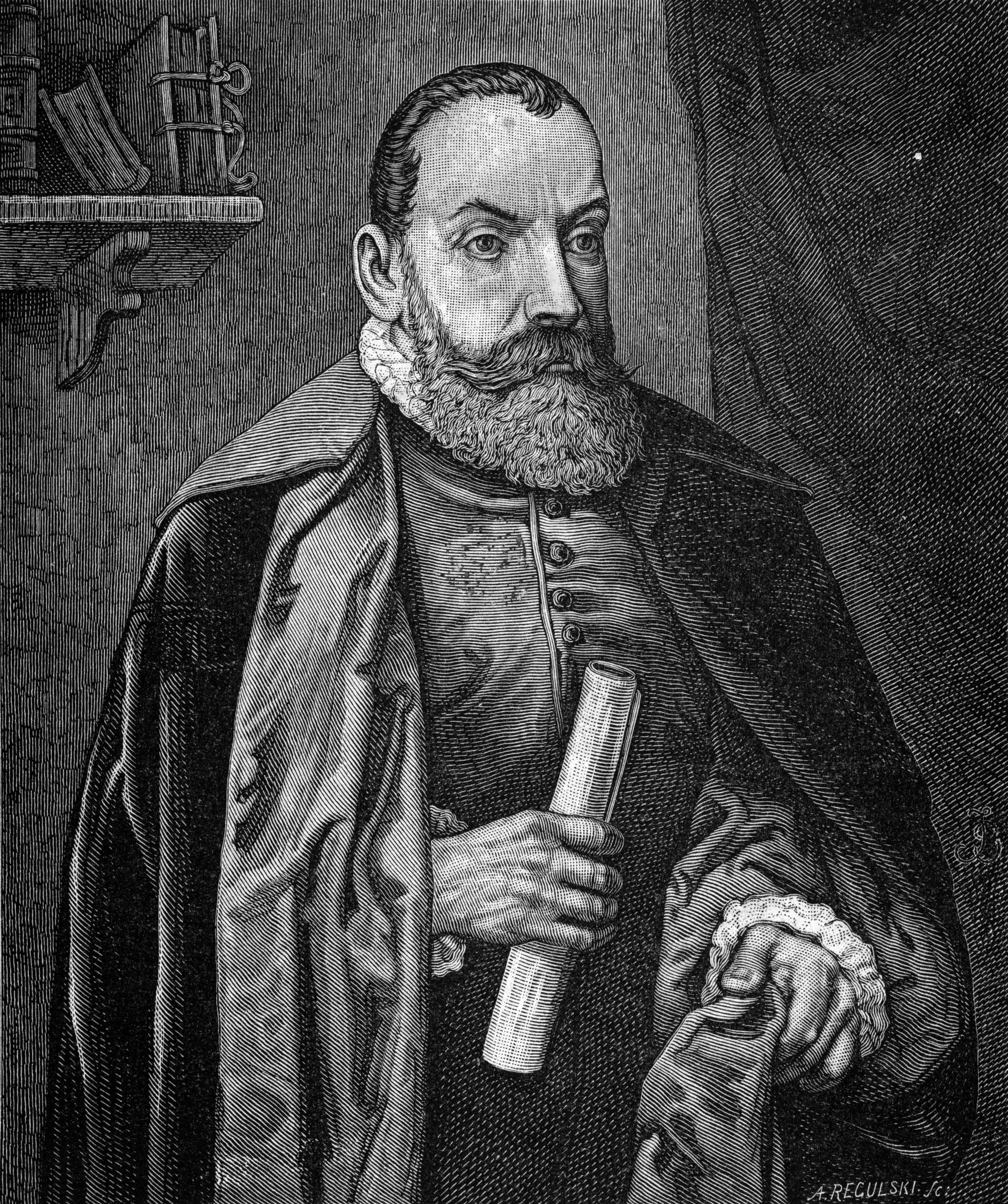
Kochanowski

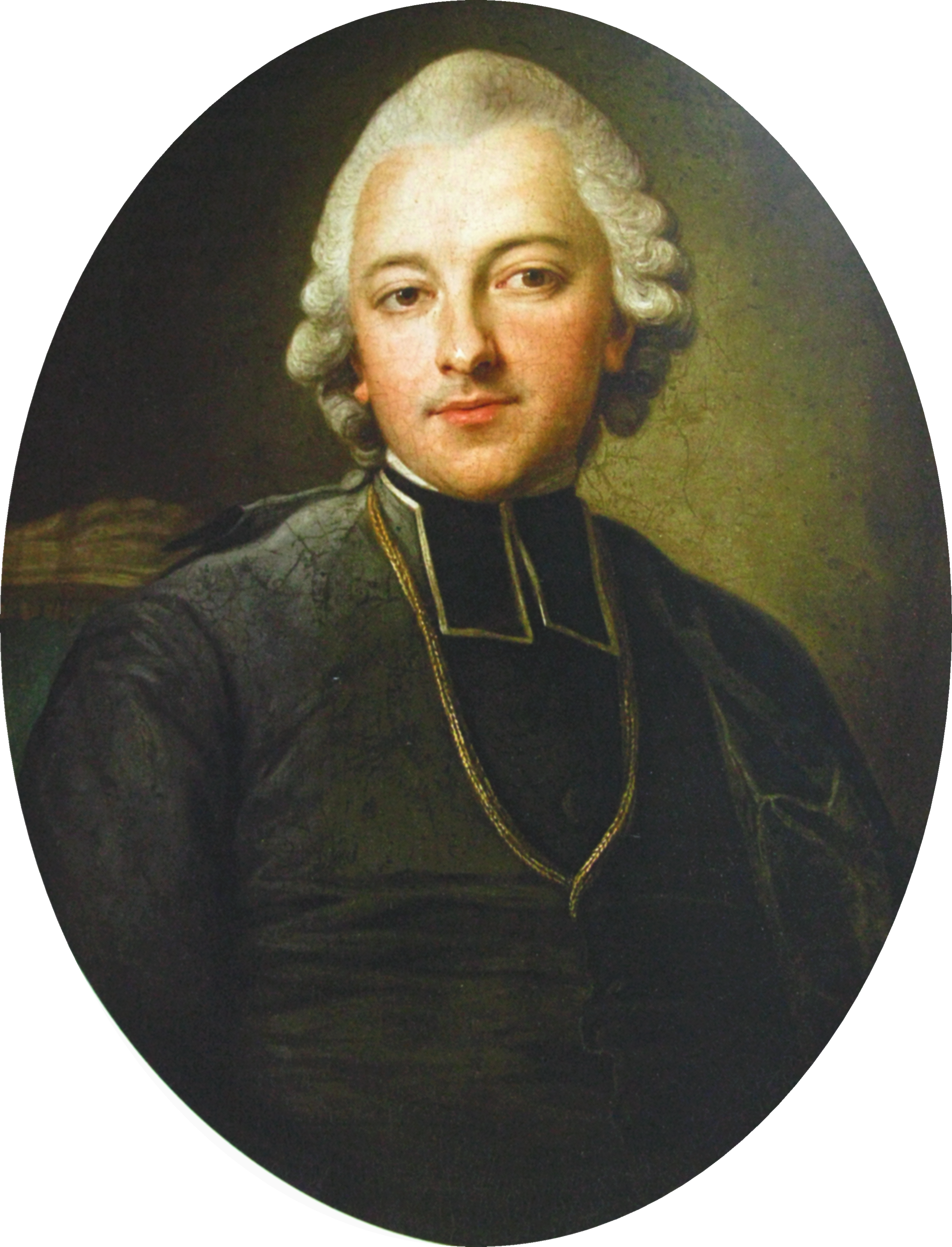
Krasicki

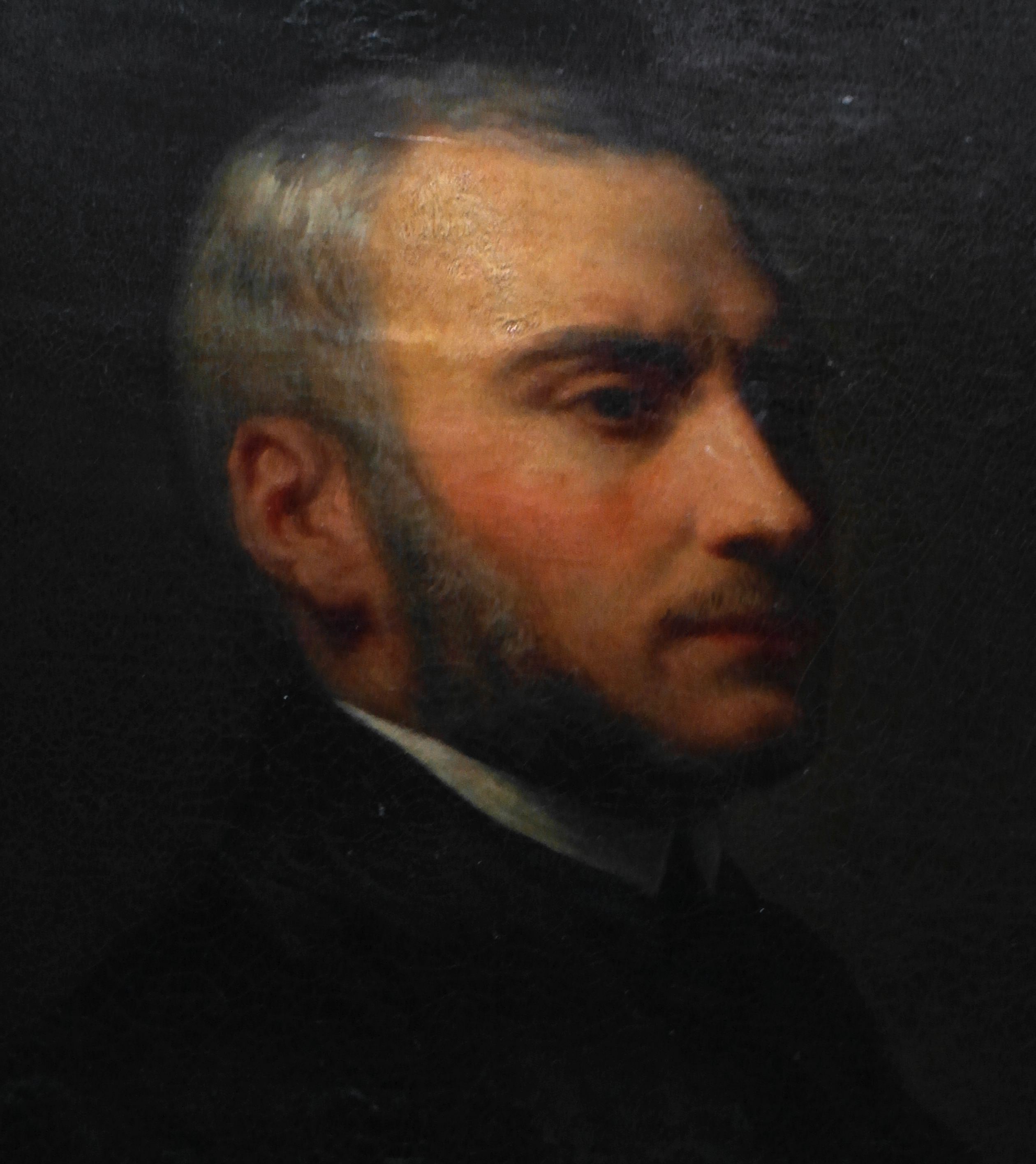
Krasiński

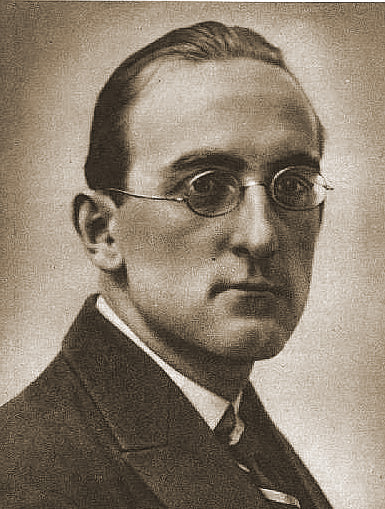
Lechoń

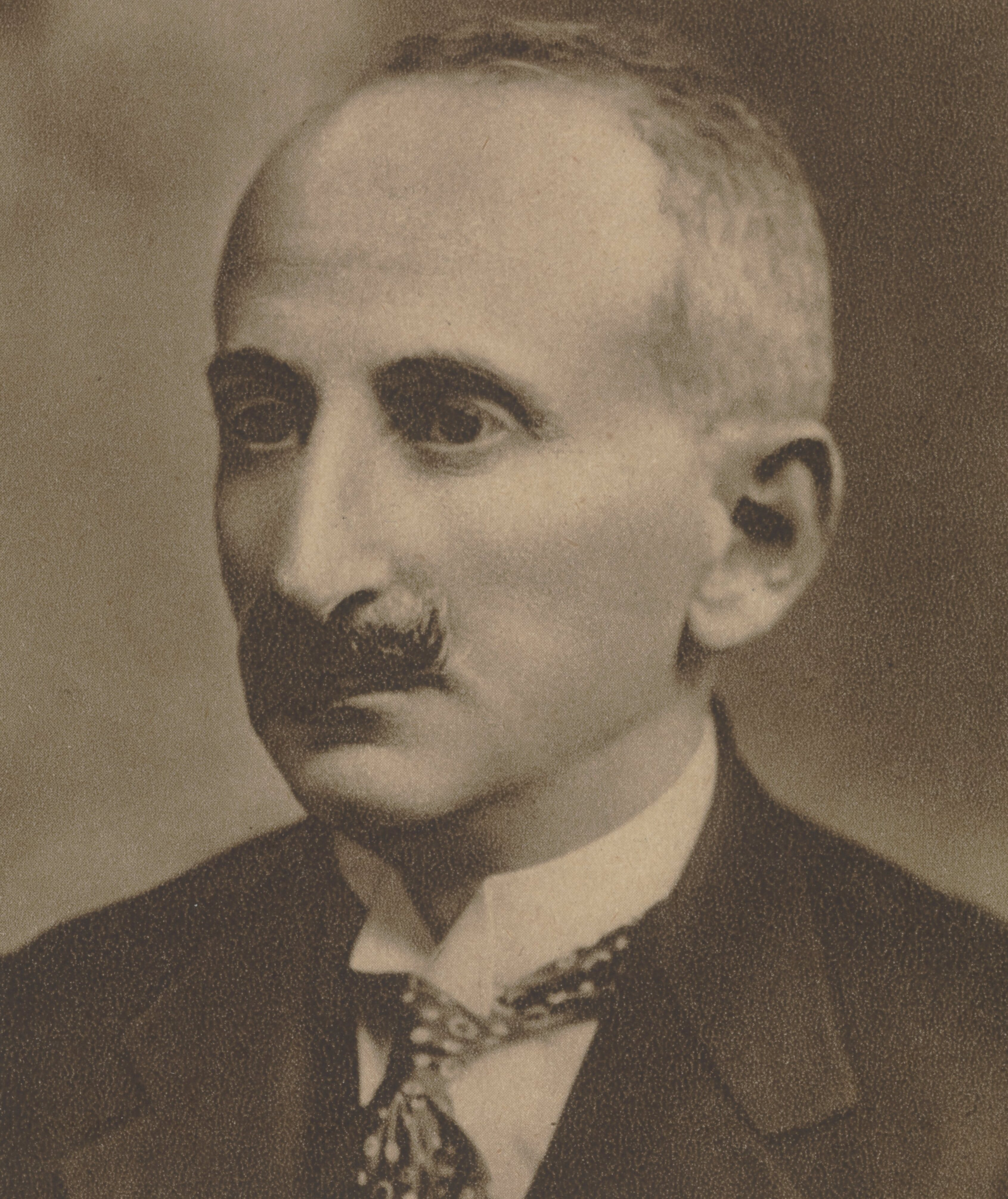
Leśmian

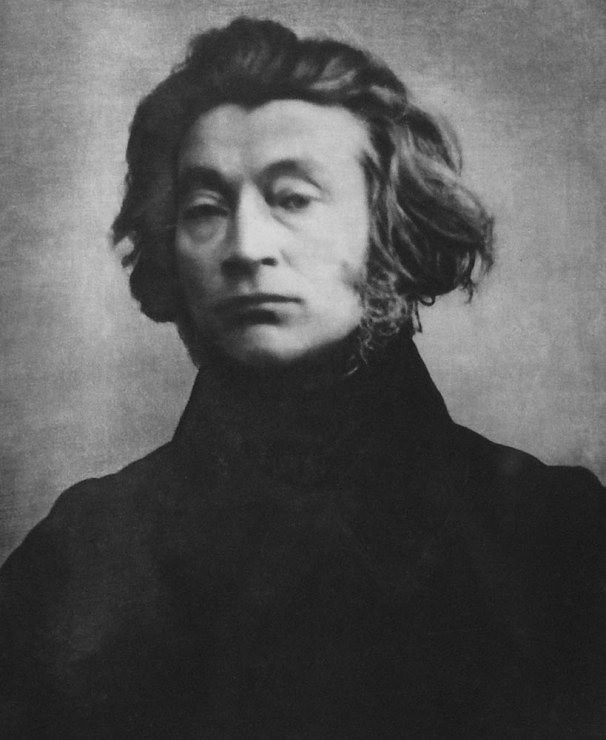
Mickiewicz

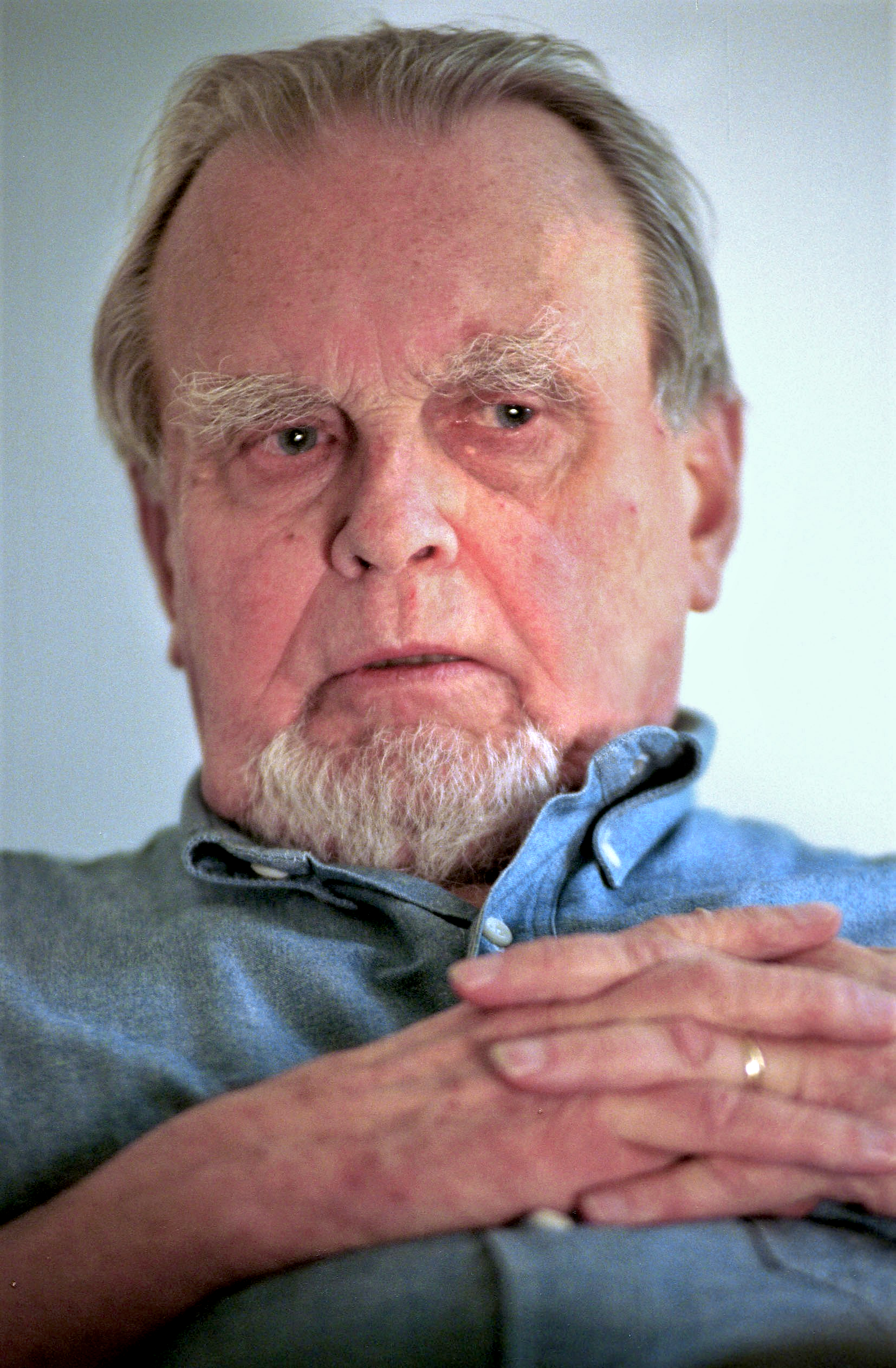
Miłosz

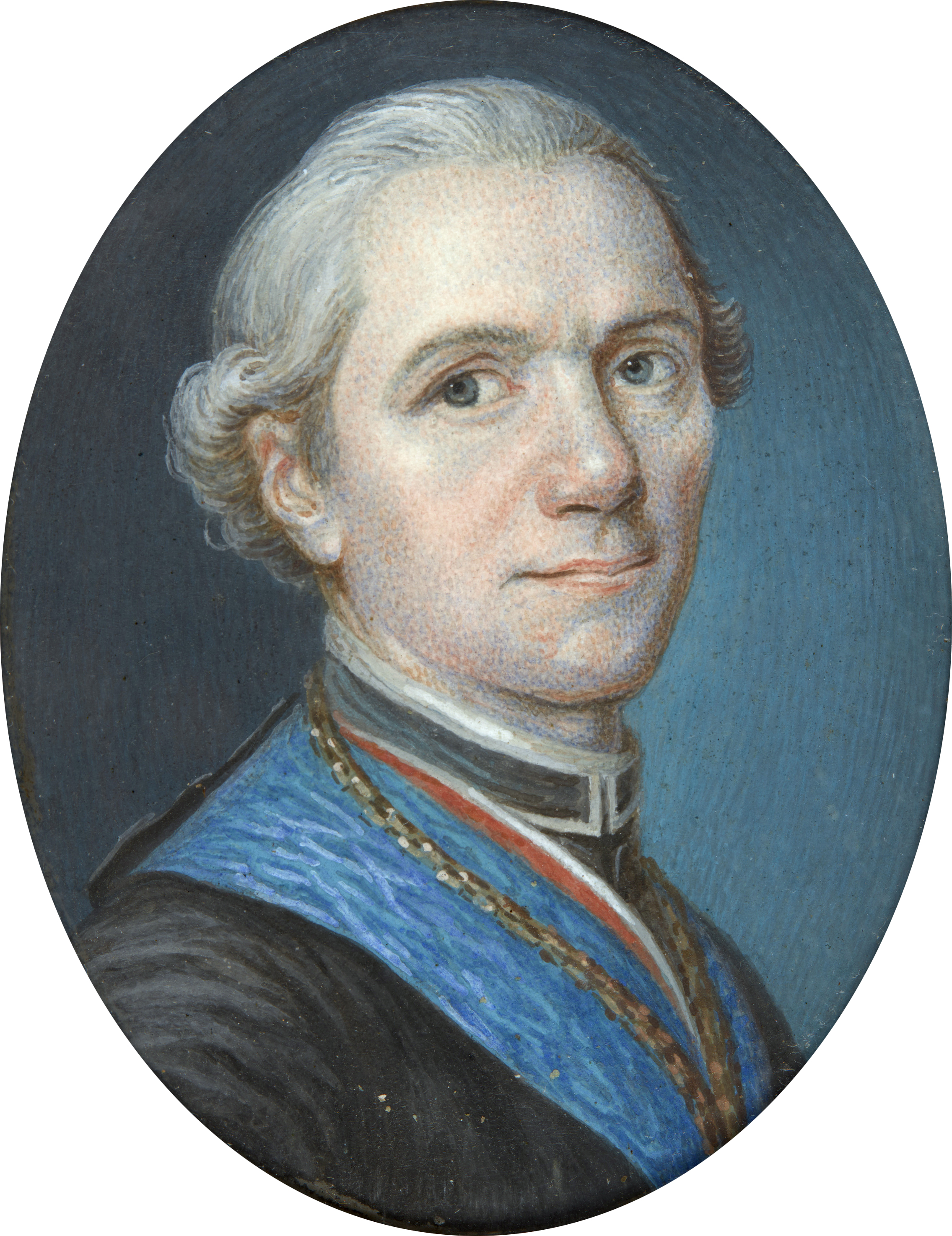
Naruszewicz

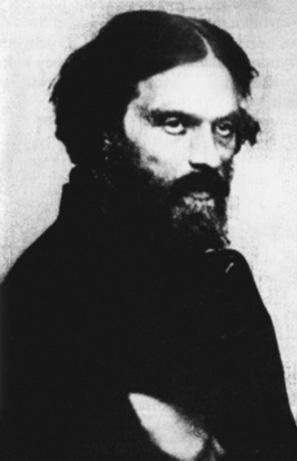
Norwid

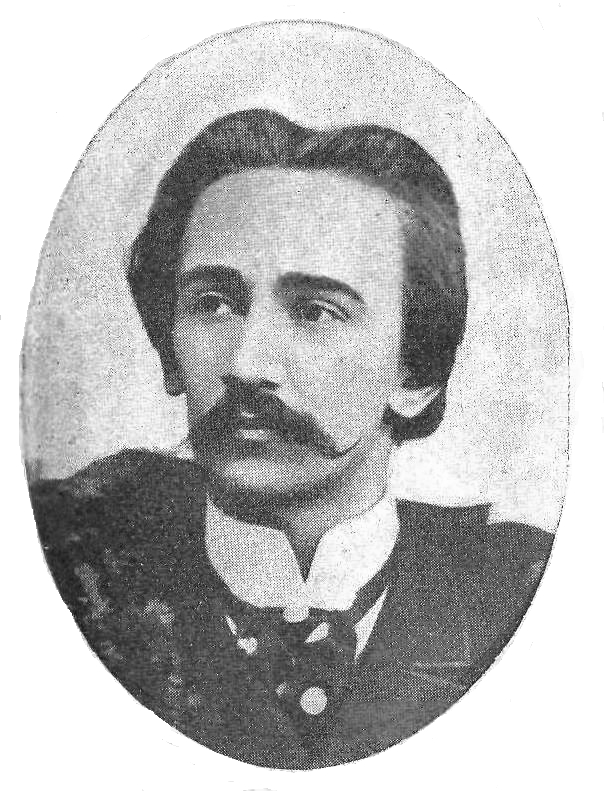
Oppman

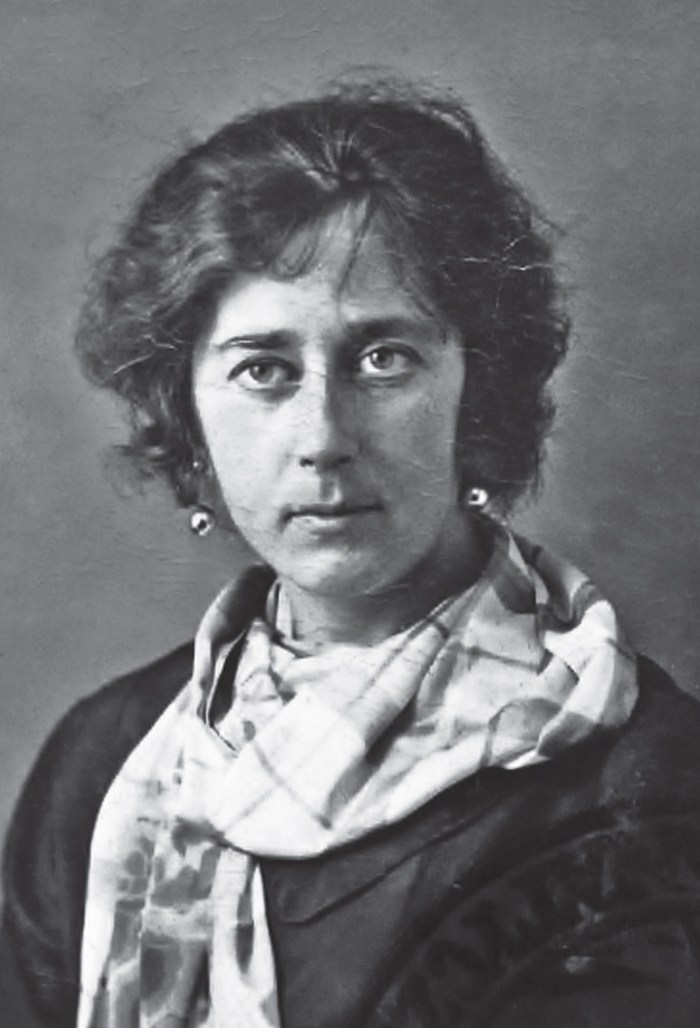
Pawlikowska-Jasnorzewska

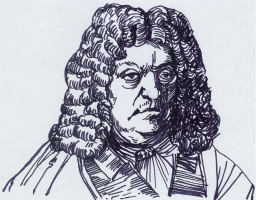
Potocki

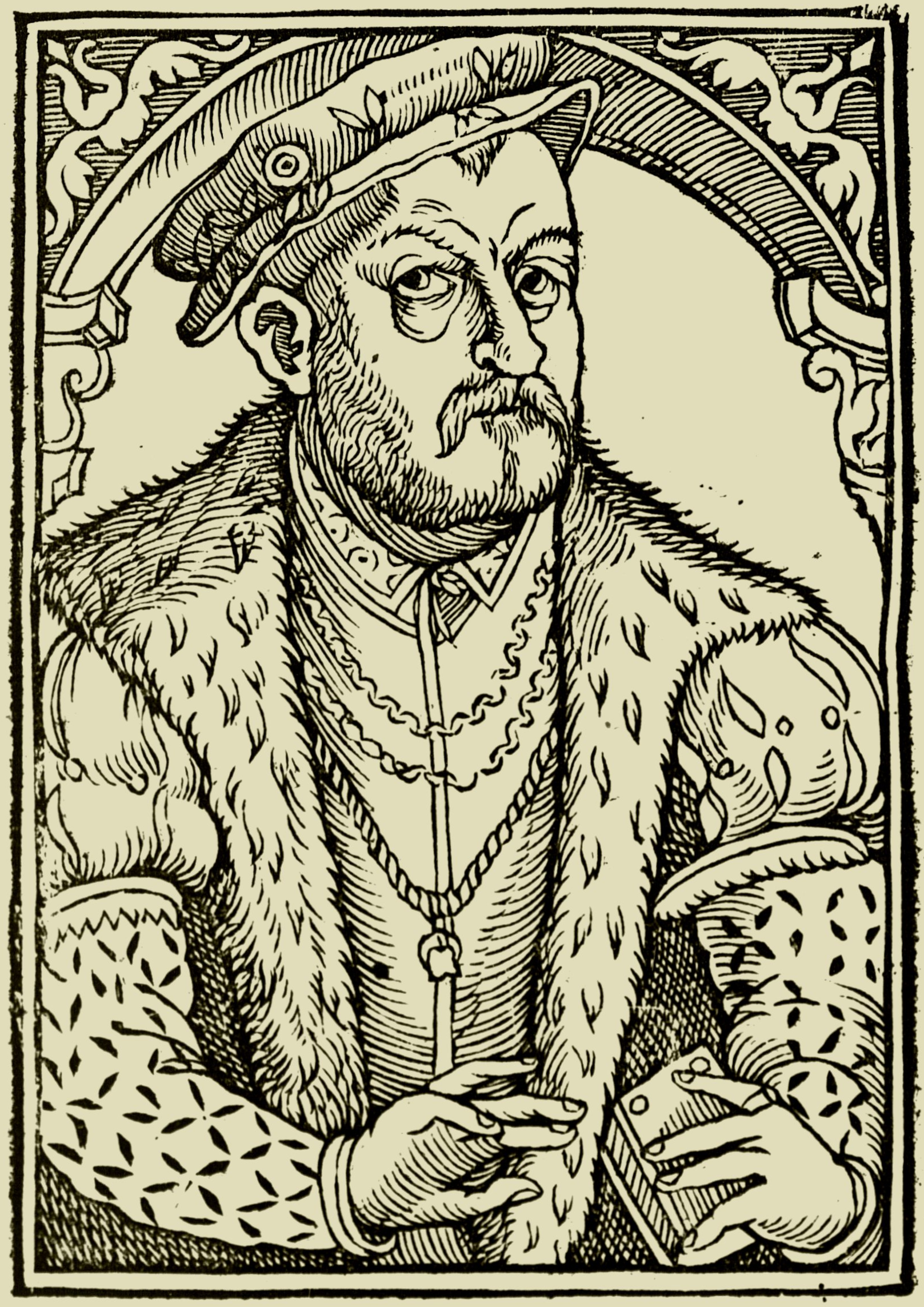
Rej

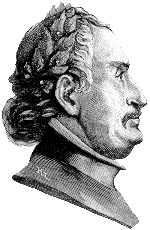
Sarbiewski

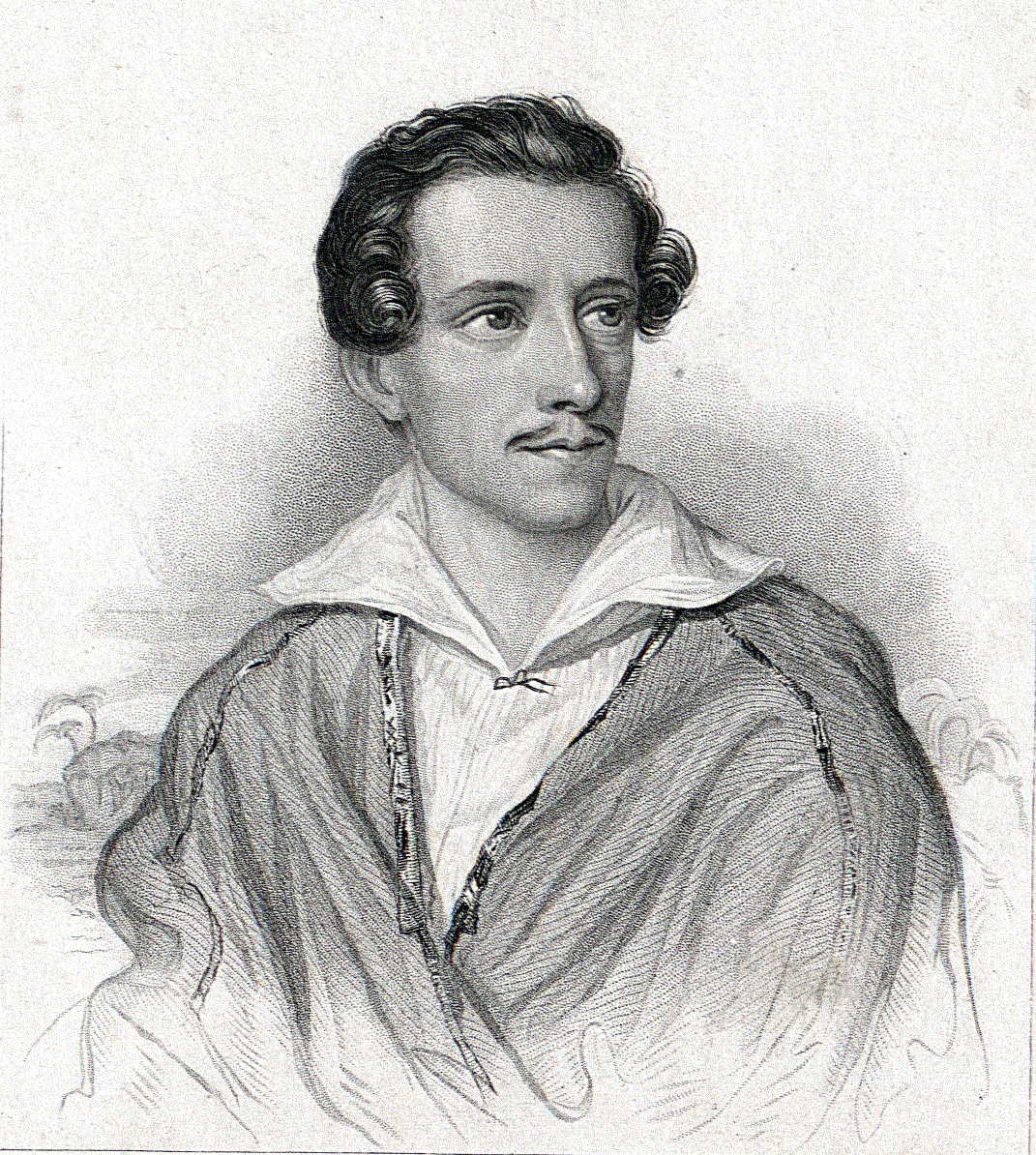
Słowacki

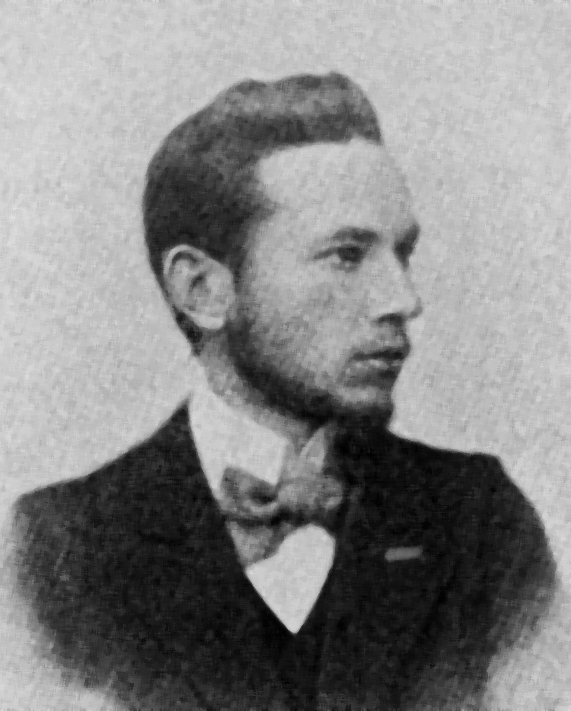
Staff

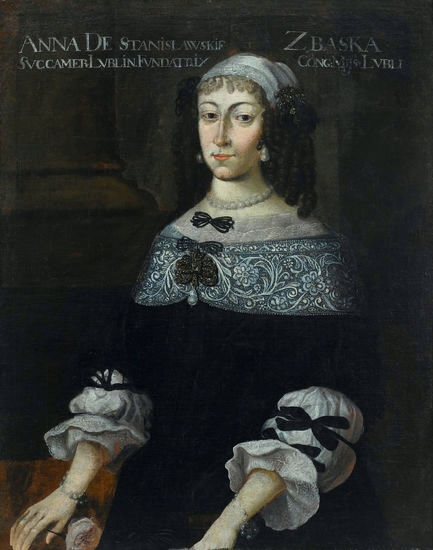
Stanisławska

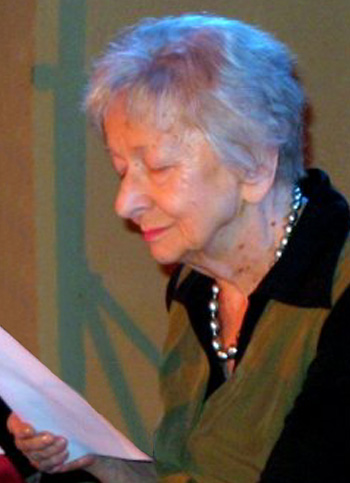
Szymborska

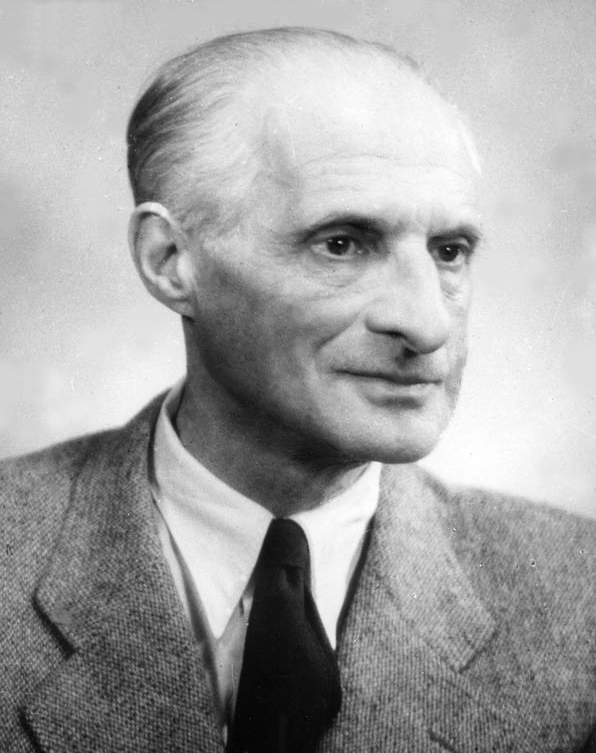
Tuwim

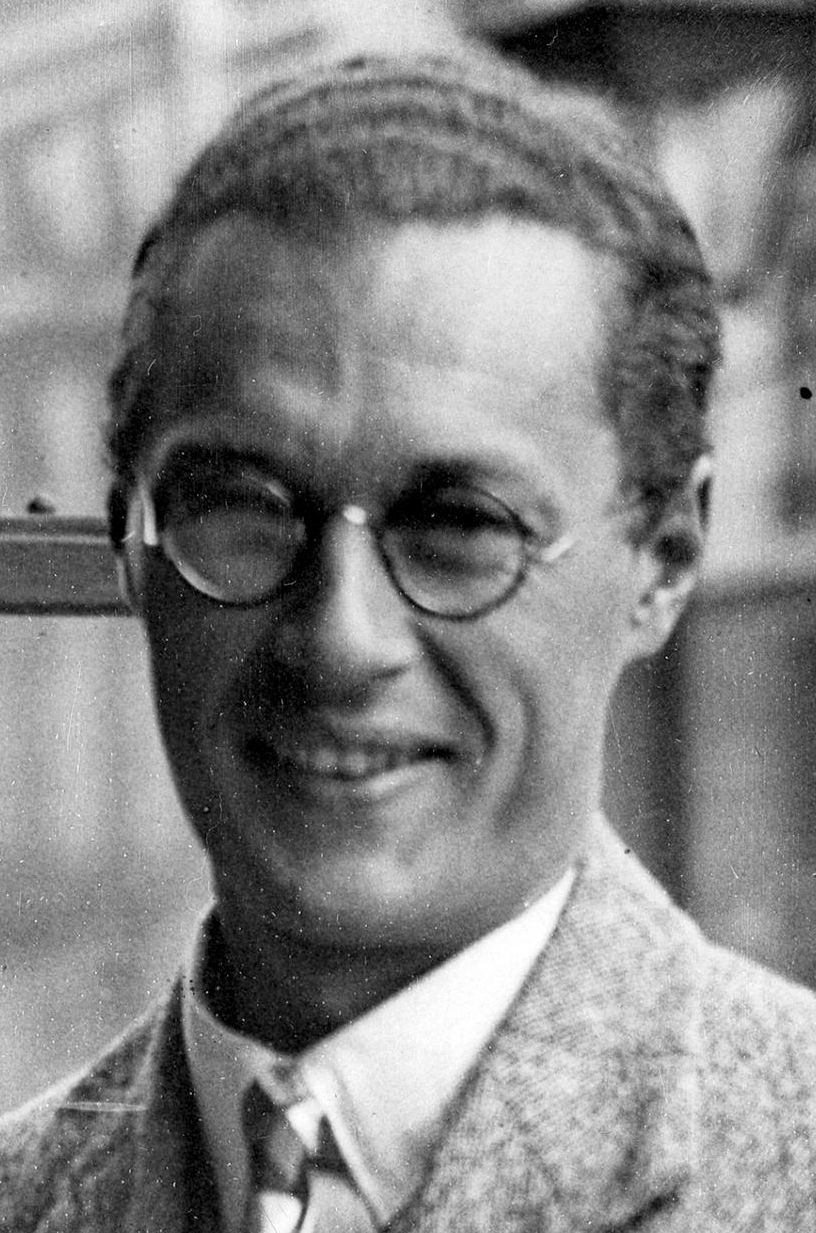
Wierzyński

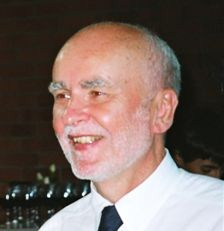
Zagajewski

== Music ==
- Chava Alberstein, Israeli singer-songwriter
- Piotr Anderszewski, pianist
- Stefan Askenase, Polish-Belgian pianist
- Emanuel Ax, American pianist
- Grażyna Bacewicz, composer
- Maria Baliszewska, ethnomusicologist, journalist
- Stanisław Barcewicz, conductor, violinist
- Edyta Bartosiewicz, singer
- Kamil Bednarek, reggae and dancehall vocalist, songwriter, composer and musician
- Michał Bergson, pianist composer, promoter of Chopin and father of Henri Bergson
- Marek Biliński, electronic music composer
- Rafał Blechacz, pianist
- Jan Nepomucen Bobrowicz, composer ("the Chopin of guitar")
- Stan Borys, singer-songwriter
- Monika Brodka, singer
- Dariusz Brzozowski, drummer
- Jan Borysewicz, composer, singer, guitarist
- Grzegorz Ciechowski, composer, singer
- Fryderyk Chopin, composer and pianist
- Agnieszka Chylińska, singer-songwriter, author and television personality
- Marcel Chyrzyński, composer
- Cleo, singer
- Krzysztof Czerwiński, conductor and organist
- Adam Darski, singer-songwriter, guitarist
- Ania Dąbrowska, singer-songwriter, composer
- Ewa Demarczyk, singer
- Krzesimir Dębski, composer
- Wojciech Długoraj, lutenist, composer
- Andrzej Dobrowolski, composer
- Doda, singer
- Ignacy Feliks Dobrzyński, composer
- Jan Drozdowski, pianist and music teacher
- Urszula Dudziak, singer
- Walek Dzedzej, punk performer
- Józef Elsner, composer, Chopin's piano teacher
- Ewa Farna, Polish-Czech singer
- Mieczysław Fogg, singer
- Robert 'Litza' Friedrich, rock singer
- Anna German, singer
- Mikołaj Gomółka, composer
- Grzegorz Gerwazy Gorczycki, composer
- Kasia Glowicka, composer
- Konstanty Gorski, composer and violinist
- Henryk Górecki, composer
- Edyta Górniak, singer
- Marek Grechuta, singer-songwriter, composer, and lyricist
- Roman Haubenstock-Ramati (1919–1994), composer and music editor
- Taco Hemingway, rapper
- Jan Hoffman, pianist and pedagogue
- Józef Hofmann, Polish-American pianist
- Mieczysław Horszowski, Polish-American pianist
- Bronisław Huberman, violinist
- Grzegorz Hyży, singer-songwriter
- Zdzisław Jachimecki, musicologist, composer
- Alicja Janosz, singer
- Anna Jantar, singer
- Adam Jarzębski, composer
- Anna Maria Jopek, singer, musician
- Jula, singer-songwriter
- Reni Jusis, singer
- Jan A. P. Kaczmarek, Oscar-winning film composer
- Jacek Kaczmarski, singer-songwriter
- Maria Kalergis, Polish-German pianist
- Bronisław Kaper, film composer
- Mieczysław Karłowicz, composer
- Jerzy Katlewicz, conductor
- Kayah, singer
- Wacław Kiełtyka, guitarist
- Stefan Kisielewski, composer, writer
- Wojciech Kilar, composer
- Krzysztof Komeda, jazz composer
- Zygmunt Konieczny, composer
- Abel Korzeniowski, film score composer
- Roman Kostrzewski, controversial singer-songwriter
- Kasia Kowalska, singer
- Henryk Kowalski (1911–1982), violinist and composer
- Seweryn Krajewski, singer-songwriter
- Dawid Kwiatkowski, singer-songwriter
- Mira Kubasińska, blues rock singer
- Rafał Kuczynski ('Human Error')
- Hanna Kulenty, composer
- Karol Kurpiński, composer
- Lucjan Kydryński, music critic, writer
- Wanda Landowska, harpsichordist
- Teodor Leszetycki, Austrian-Polish pianist, pedagogue
- Monika Lewczuk, singer-songwriter, model
- Franciszek Lilius, composer
- Lydia Kindermann, opera singer
- Karol Lipiński, composer, virtuoso violinist (about equal to Niccolò Paganini)
- Jan Lisiecki, Canadian pianist
- Ewelina Lisowska, singer-songwriter
- Michał Lorenc, film score composer
- Jan z Lublina, composer
- Witold Lutosławski, composer
- Jerzy Maksymiuk, conductor
- Ray Manzarek, American musician, singer, keyboardist of The Doors
- Margaret, singer-songwriter
- Patrycja Markowska, pop rock singer
- Mata, rapper
- Paweł Mąciwoda, bassist, member of the German rock band Scorpions
- Megitza, singer, double bass player, and composer
- Krzysztof Meyer, composer
- Aleksander Michałowski, pianist and pedagogue
- Marcin Mielczewski, composer
- Maciek Miernik, producer
- Carl Mikuli, composer
- Emil Młynarski, conductor and composer
- Stanisław Moniuszko, composer
- Moritz Moszkowski, German-Polish composer
- Czesław Mozil, Polish-Danish singer and musician
- Leszek Możdżer, pianist and composer
- Tadeusz Nalepa, composer, guitar player, vocalist, and lyricist
- Czesław Niemen, singer-songwriter
- Katarzyna Nosowska, singer-songwriter
- Marcin Nowak, guitarist and singer
- Feliks Nowowiejski, composer
- Zygmunt Noskowski, composer
- Natalia Nykiel, singer-songwriter
- Wiesław Ochman, opera singer
- Michał Kazimierz Ogiński, composer
- Michał Kleofas Ogiński, composer
- Hanka Ordonówna, singer, actress, dancer
- O.S.T.R., rapper, musician
- Tede, rapper, musician
- Ignacy Jan Paderewski, pianist, composer
- Andrzej Panufnik, composer
- Włodek Pawlik, jazz musician, composer
- Krzysztof Penderecki, composer
- Maria Peszek, singer-songwriter
- Jerzy Petersburski, pianist, composer
- Egon Petri (1881–1962), pianist of Dutch extraction who never lived in Holland; lived and worked in Poland, 1927–31 August 1939; was fluent in Polish.
- Pezet, rapper
- Bartłomiej Pękiel, composer
- Andrzej Piaseczny, singer-songwriter, actor, and television personality
- Svika Pick, Israeli pop singer, composer
- Dawid Podsiadło, singer
- Jerzy Połomski, singer
- Piotr Półtorak, guitarist
- Zbigniew Preisner, composer
- Zbigniew Robert Promiński, drummer
- Natalia Przybysz, rhythm and blues singer
- Pawel Przytocki, conductor
- Tomasz "Titus" Pukacki, singer
- Krzysztof Raczkowski, drummer
- Mikołaj z Radomia, Middle Ages composer
- Édouard de Reszke, bass
- Jan and Emilja Reszke, violinist and mezzo-soprano, parents of opera stars
- Jean de Reszke, tenor
- Josephine de Reszke, soprano
- Ryszard Riedel, singer
- Maryla Rodowicz, singer
- Artur Rodziński, Polish-American conductor
- Eddie Rosner, jazz, "Polish (or: The White) Louis Armstrong"
- Piotr Rubik, composer
- Arthur Rubinstein, Polish-American pianist
- Sanah, singer-songwriter
- Ada Sari, opera singer
- Jadwiga Sarnecka, composer and pianist
- Sarsa, singer-songwriter
- Bogusław Schaeffer, composer
- Xaver Scharwenka, composer
- Marcella Sembrich (1858–1935), coloratura soprano
- Kazimierz Serocki, composer
- Witold Silewicz, Polish-Austrian composer, bassist
- Józef Skrzek, composer and leader of SBB band
- Cezary Skubiszewski, Polish-Australian composer
- Marek Stachowski, composer
- Tomasz Stańko, jazz trumpeter
- Kazik Staszewski, singer-songwriter
- Muniek Staszczyk, singer
- Justyna Steczkowska, singer
- Zygmunt Stojowski, composer
- Jadwiga Szamotulska, pianist
- Wacław of Szamotuły
- Aleksander Szeligowski, composer, pedagog
- Tadeusz Szeligowski, composer, conductor
- Henryk Szeryng, Polish-Mexican violinist
- Władysław Szpilman, pianist
- Patryk Dominik Sztyber, guitarist, singer
- Maria Agata Szymanowska, composer, concert pianist
- Karol Szymanowski, composer, pianist
- Paweł Szymański, composer
- Andrzej Szwalbe, first director of the Pomeranian Philharmonic
- Aleksandra Szwed, singer, actress, television presenter
- André Tchaikowsky, pianist, composer
- Barbara Trzetrzelewska, singer popularly known as "Basia"
- Grzegorz Turnau, singer
- Ifi Ude, Nigerian and Polish singer
- Michał Urbaniak, jazz musician
- Moshe Vilenski, Polish-Israeli composer, lyricist, and pianist
- Violetta Villas, singer-songwriter
- Andrzej Wasowski, pianist
- Henryk Wieniawski, composer
- Wanda Wiłkomirska, violinist
- Antoni Wit, conductor
- Piotr Wiwczarek, guitarist, singer
- Zbigniew Wodecki, singer, musician, composer, actor and TV presenter
- Tomasz Wróblewski, guitarist, singer
- Aga Zaryan, jazz singer
- Mikołaj Zieleński, composer
- Krystian Zimerman, pianist
- Władysław Żeleński, composer
- Wojciech Żywny, Czech-born Polish composer, Chopin's first professional piano teacher
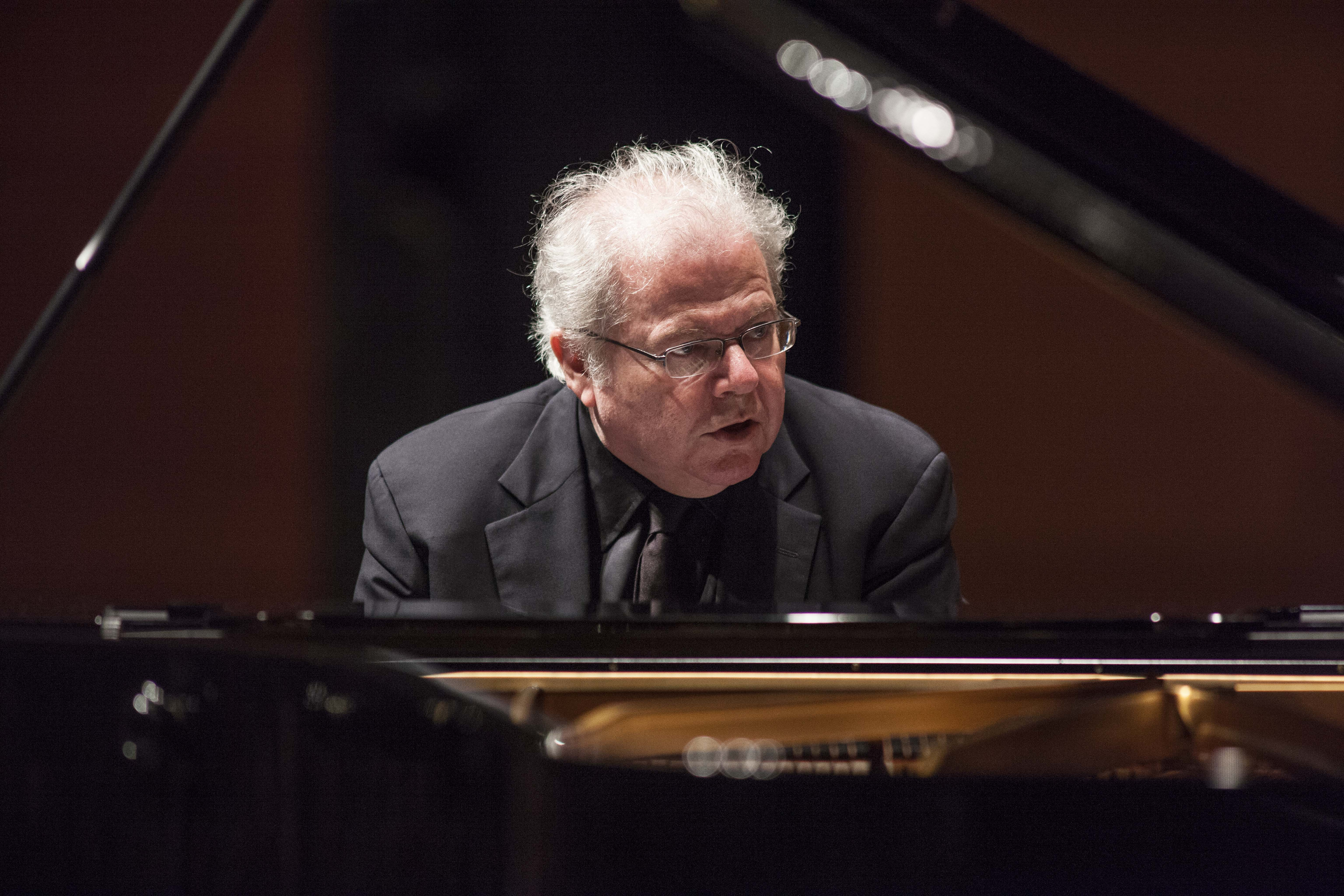
Emanuel Ax

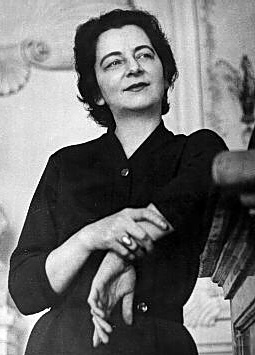
Bacewicz

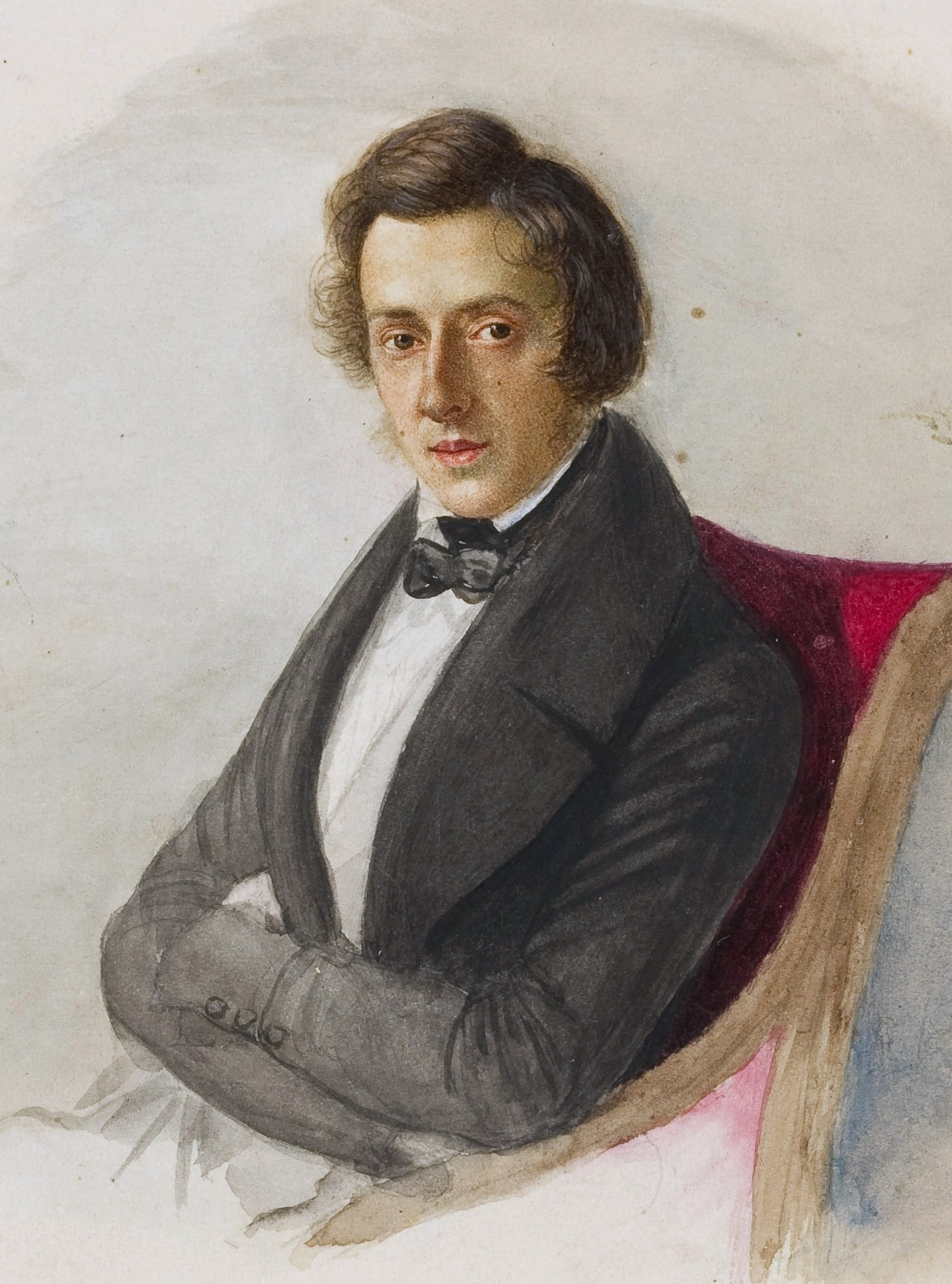
Chopin

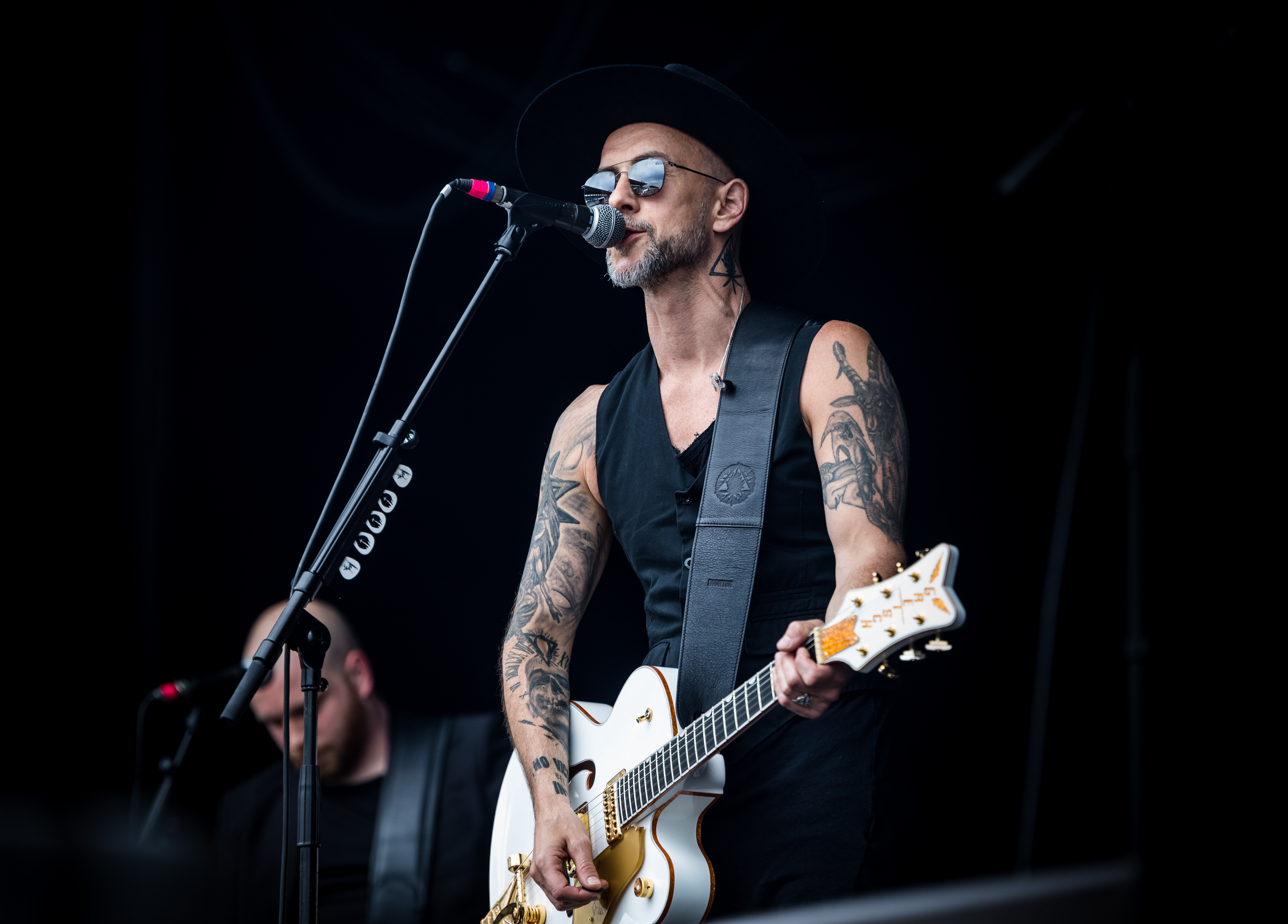
Darski

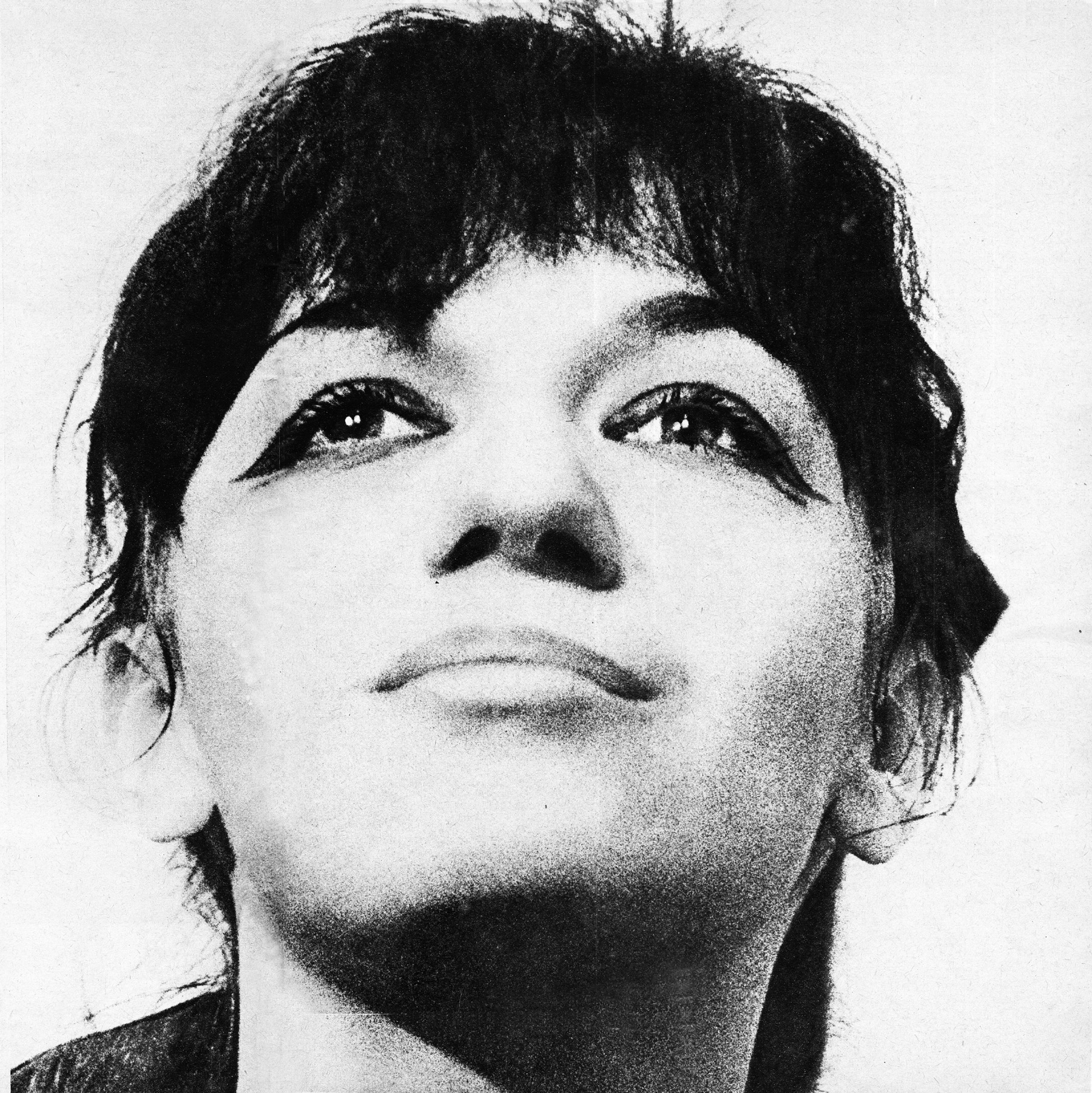
Demarczyk

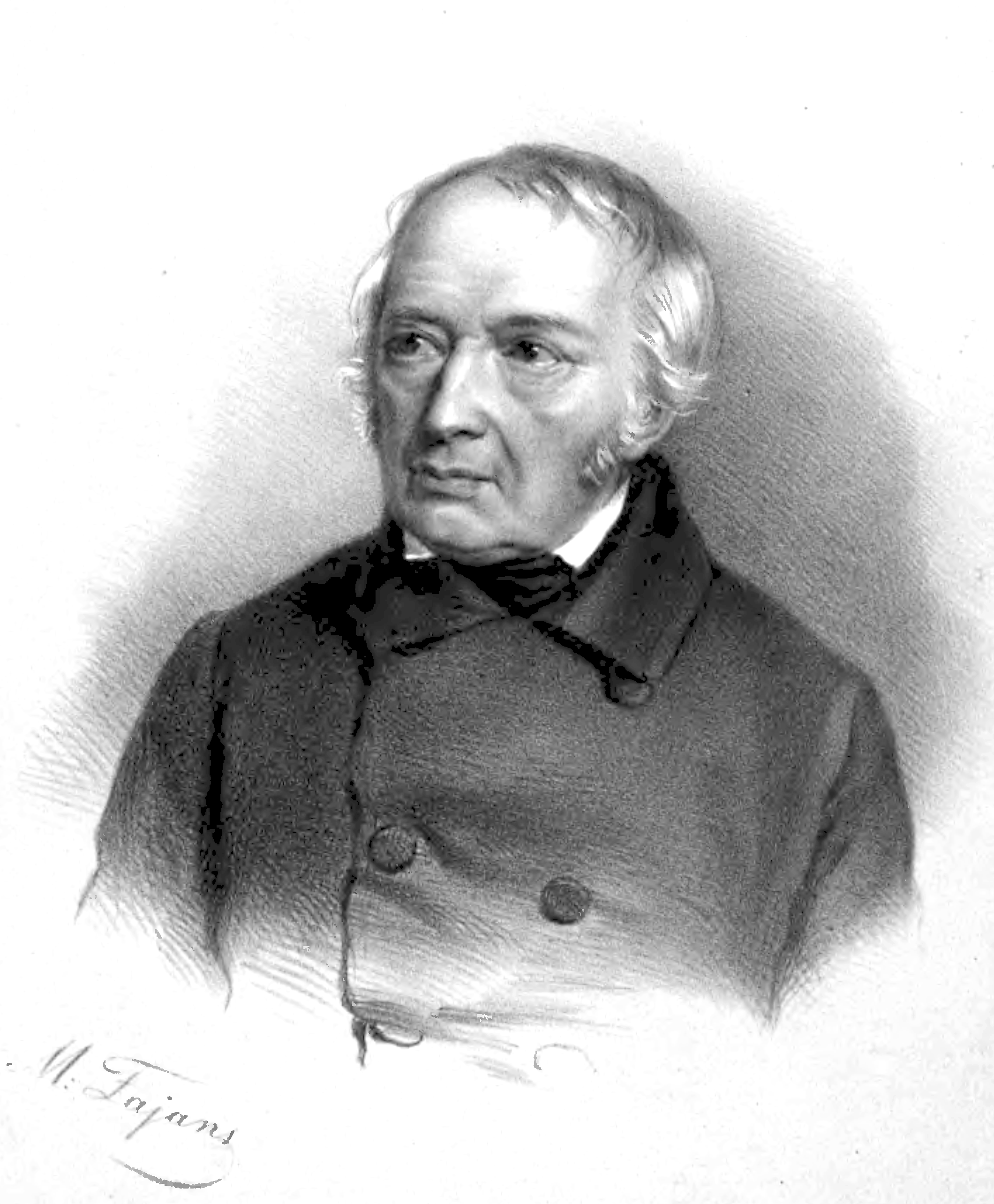
Elsner

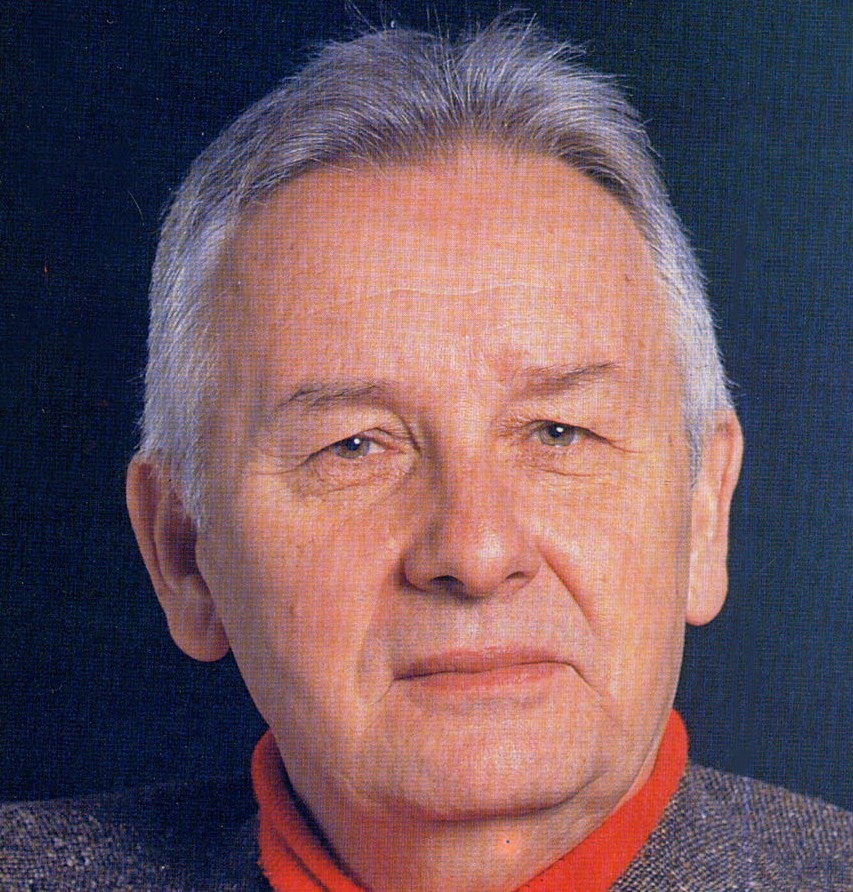
Górecki

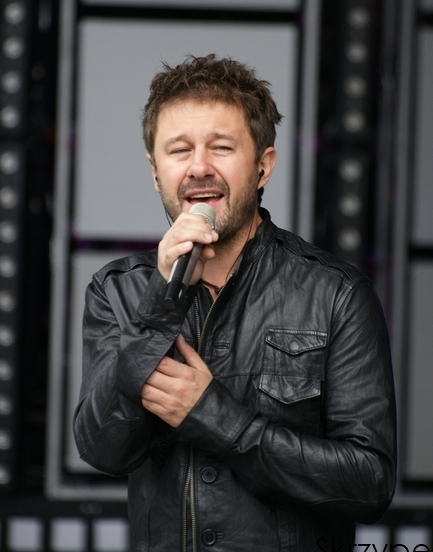
Piaseczny

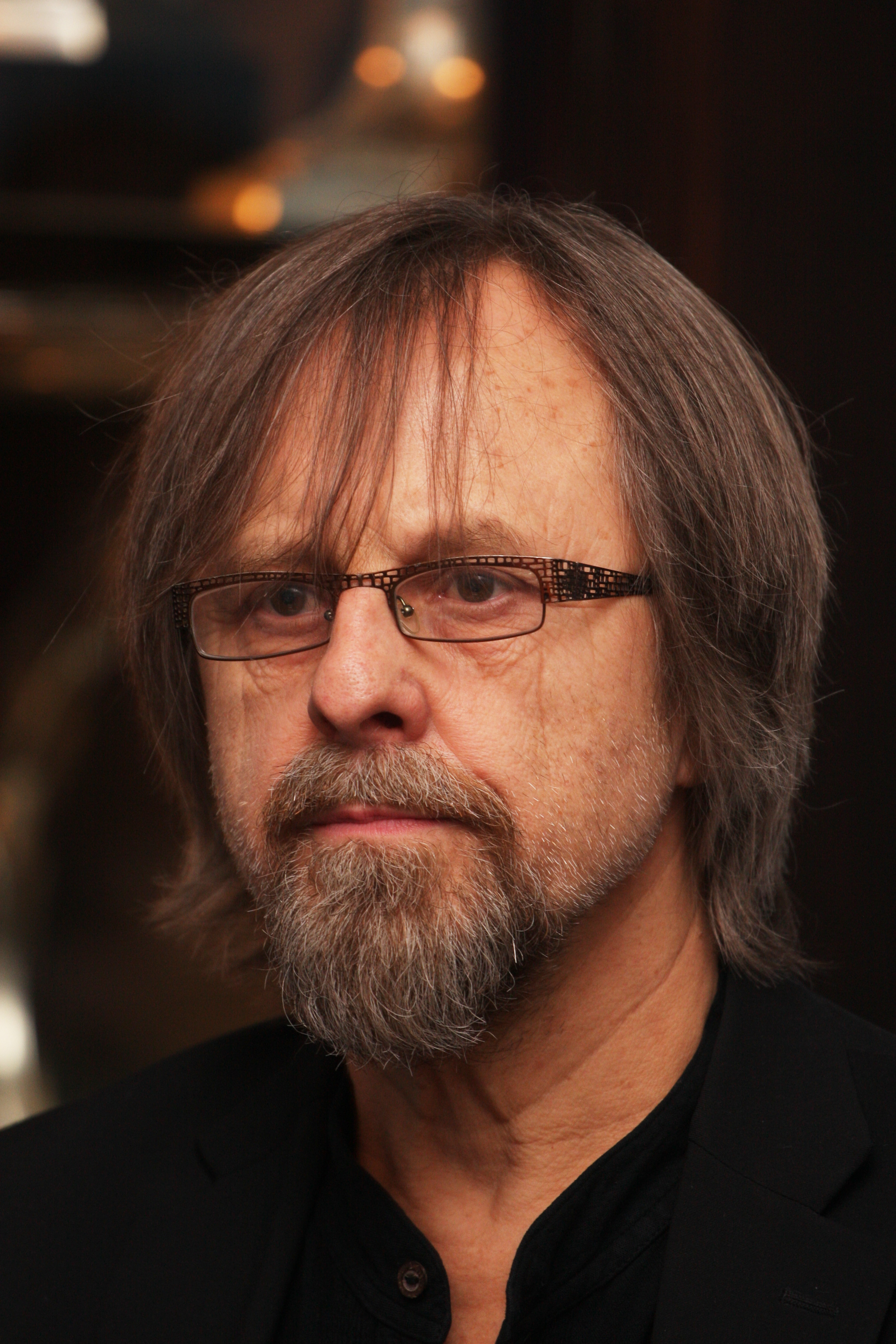
Kaczmarek

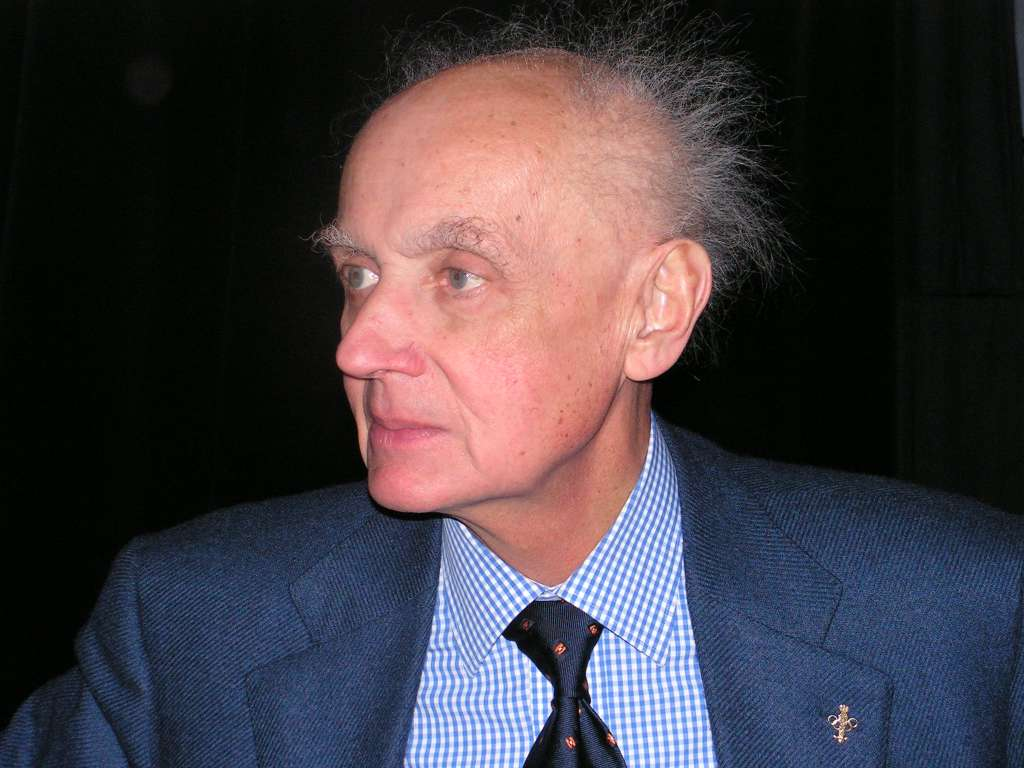
Kilar

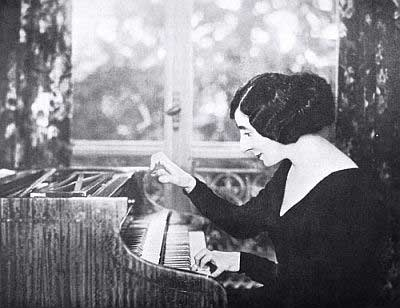
Landowska

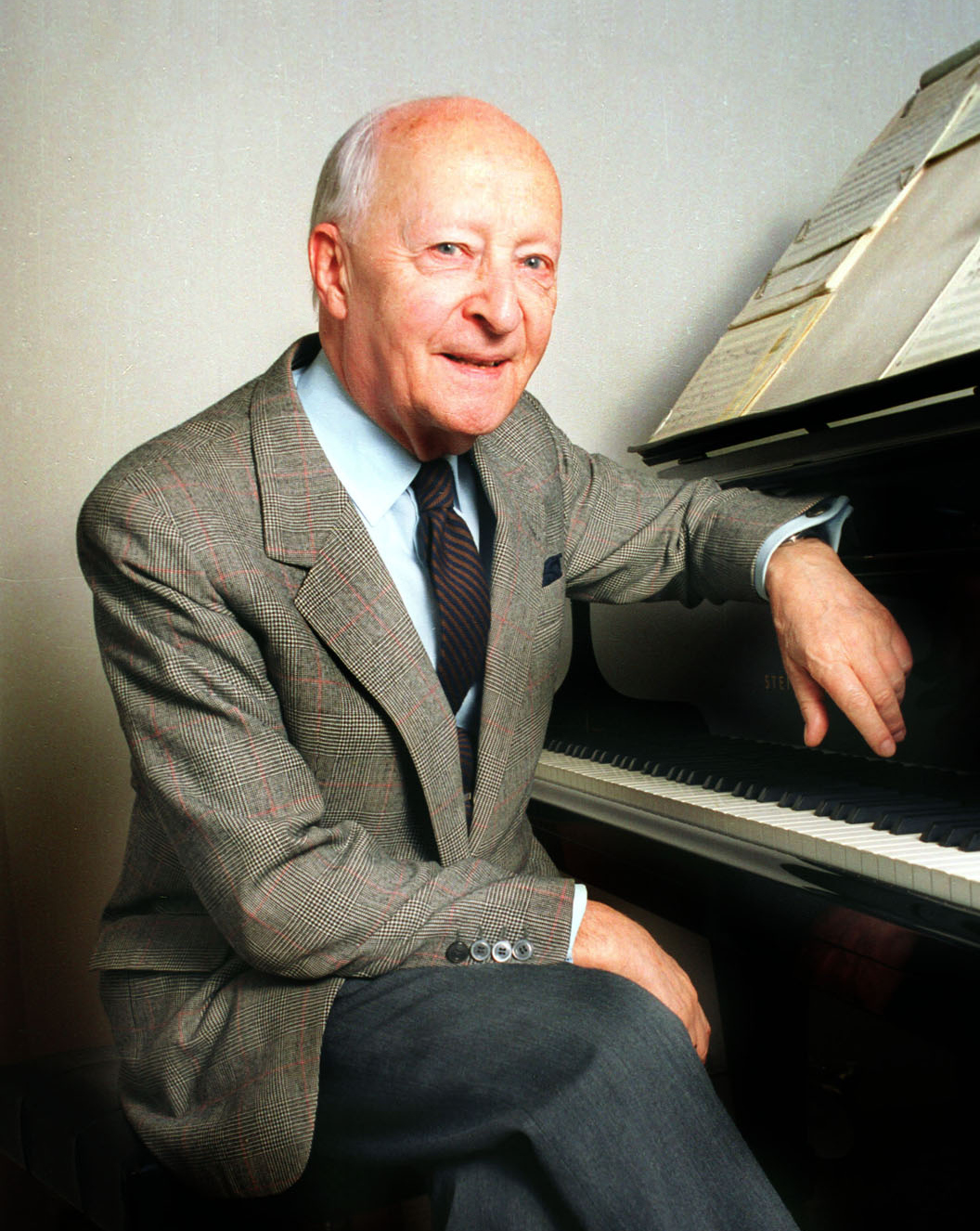
Lutosławski

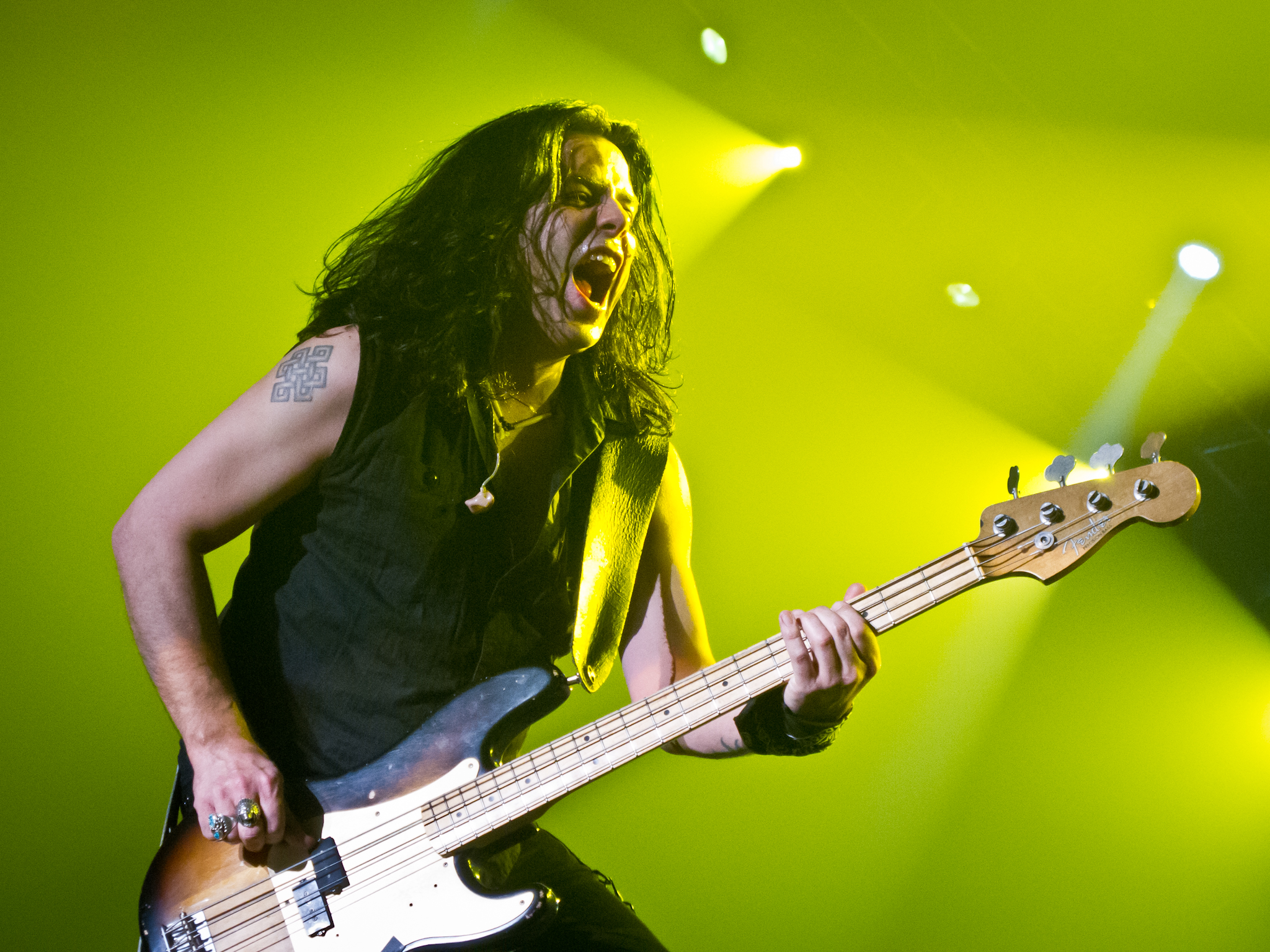
Mąciwoda

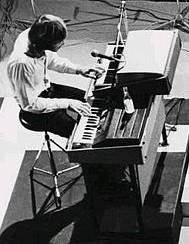
Manzarek

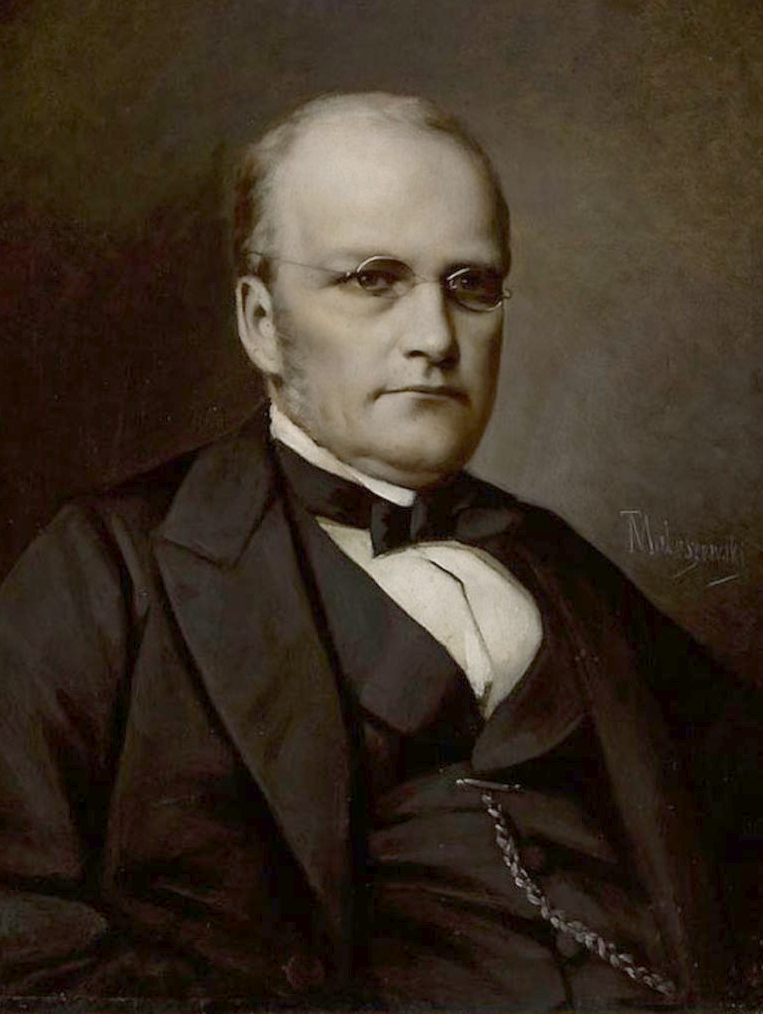
Moniuszko

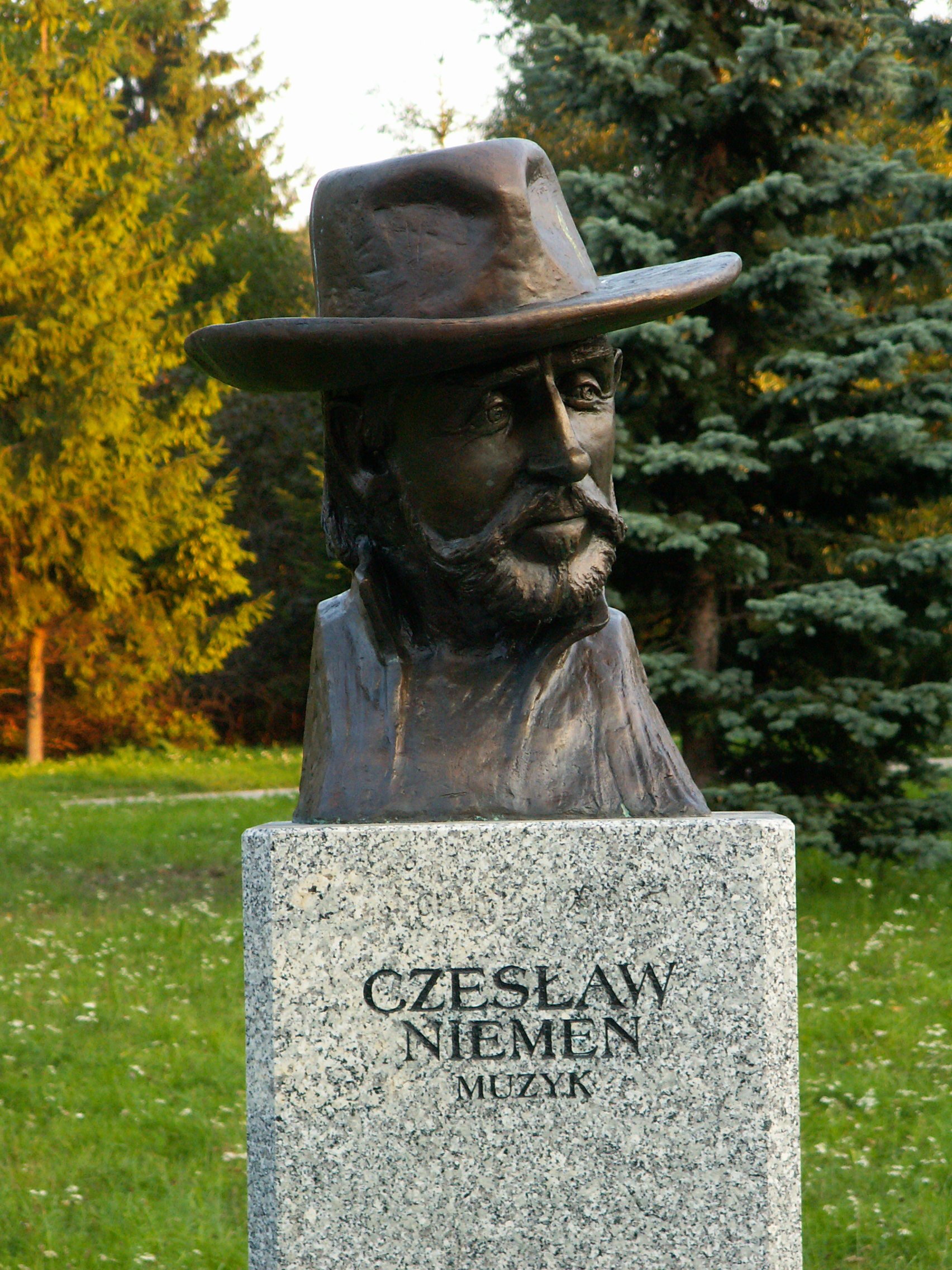
Niemen

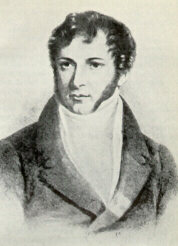
Ogiński

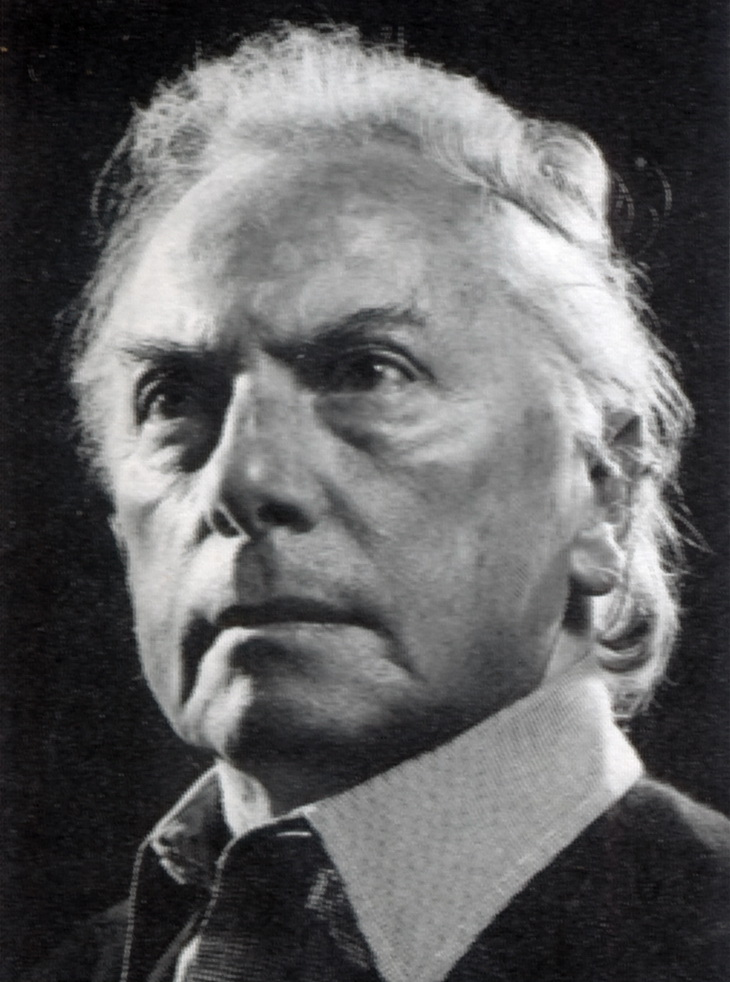
Panufnik

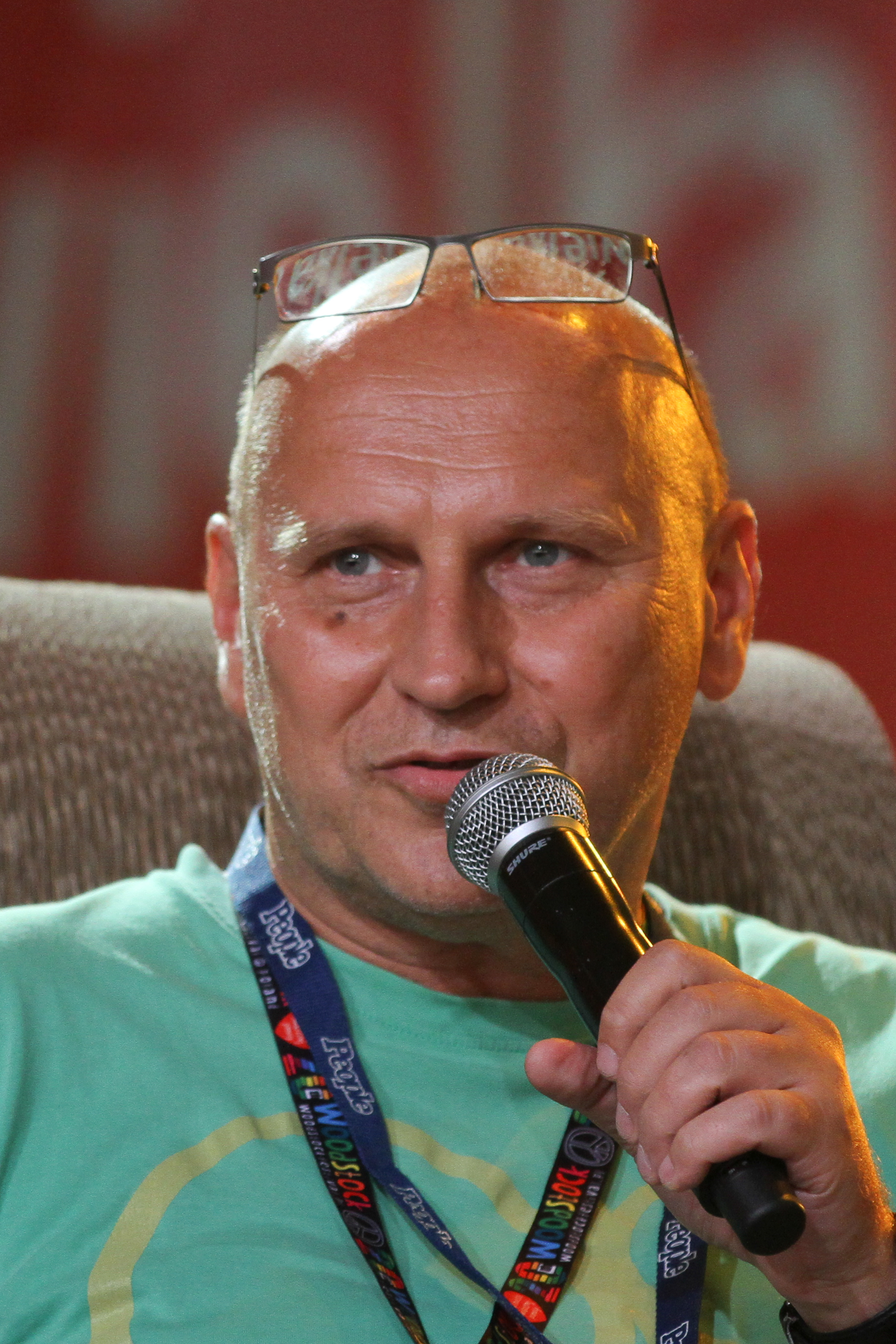
Pawlik

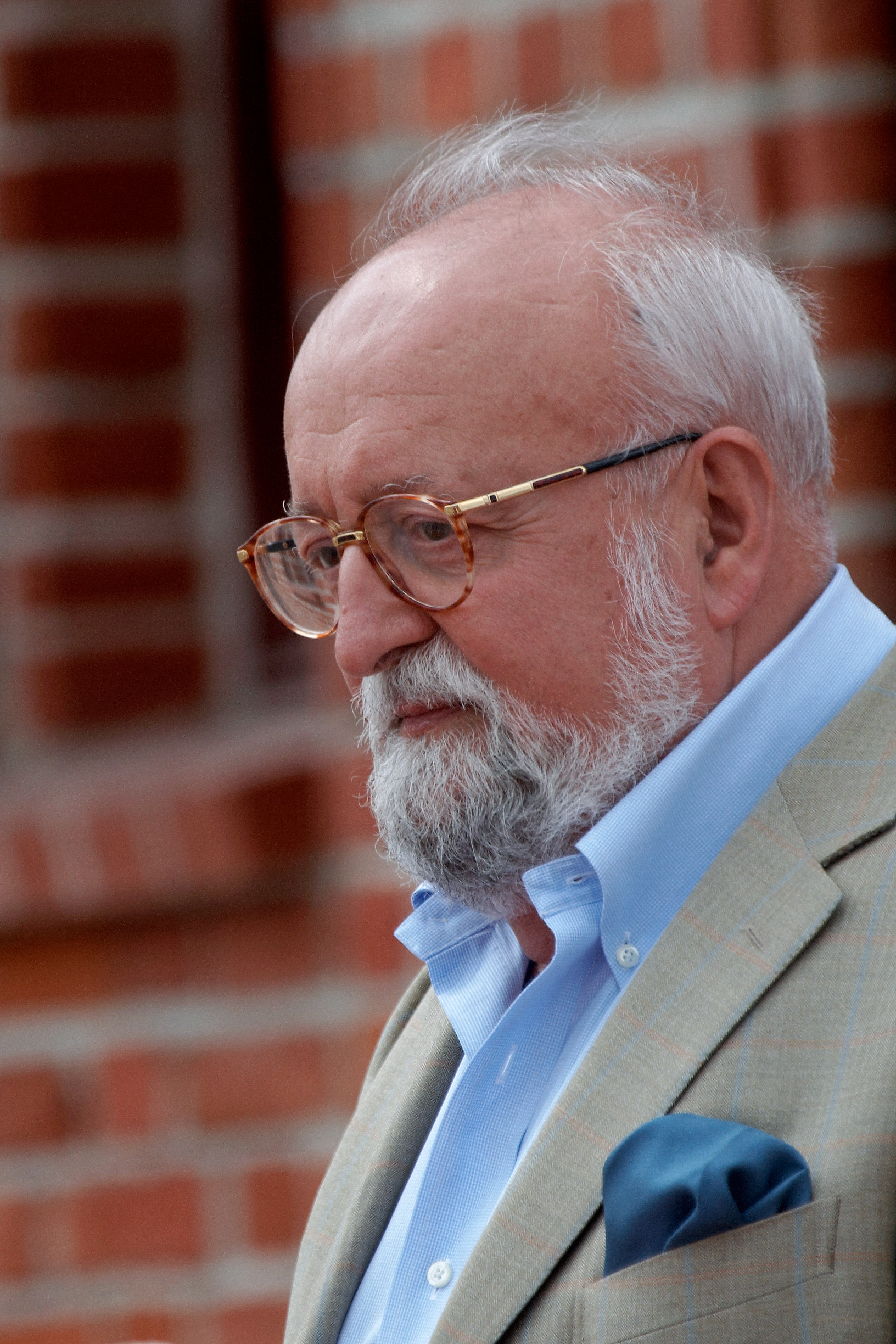
Penderecki

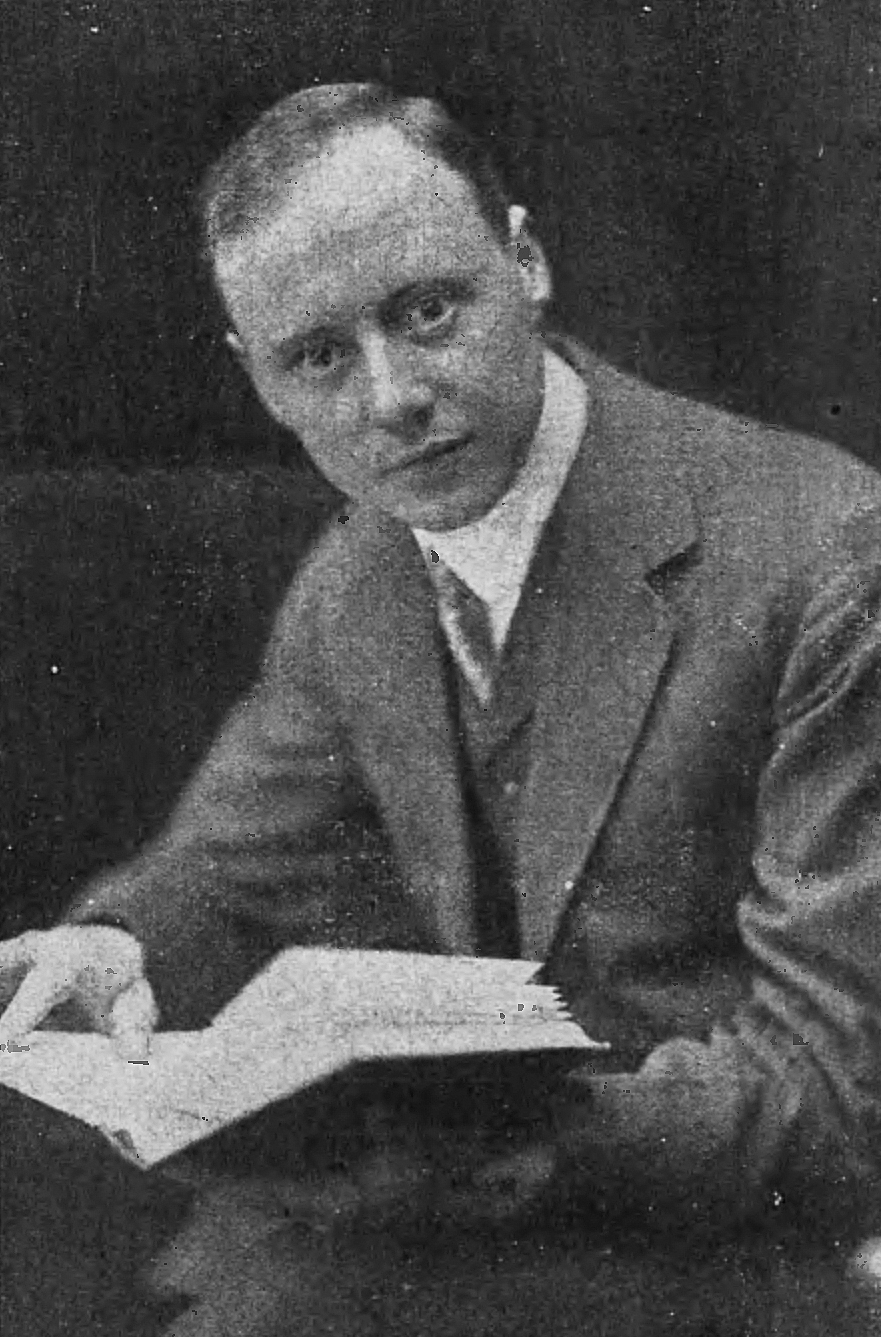
Petri

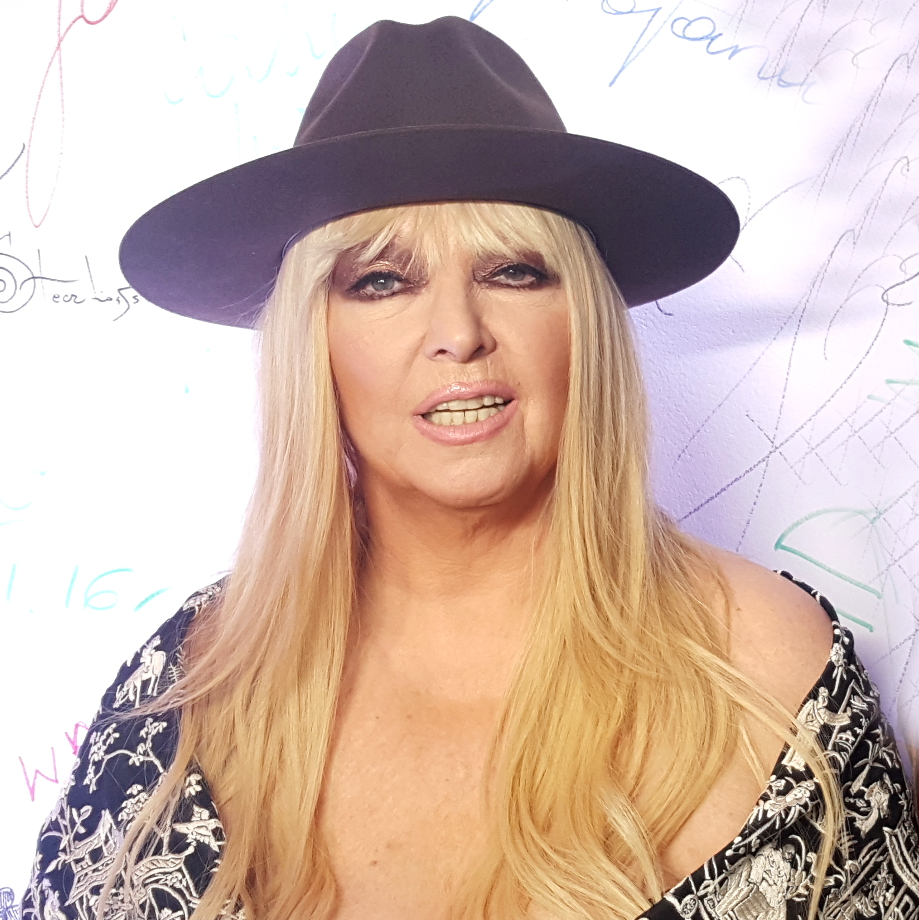
Rodowicz

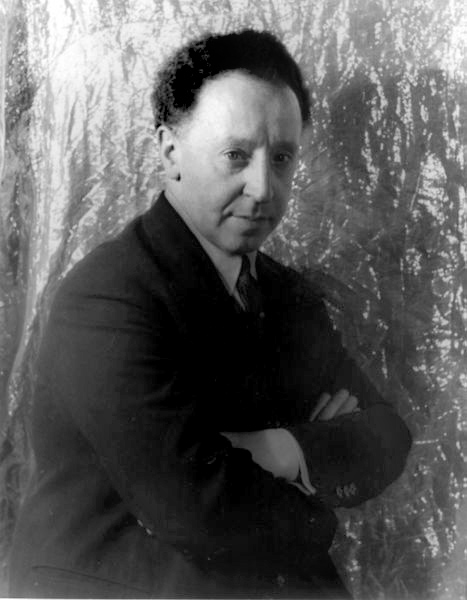
Rubinstein

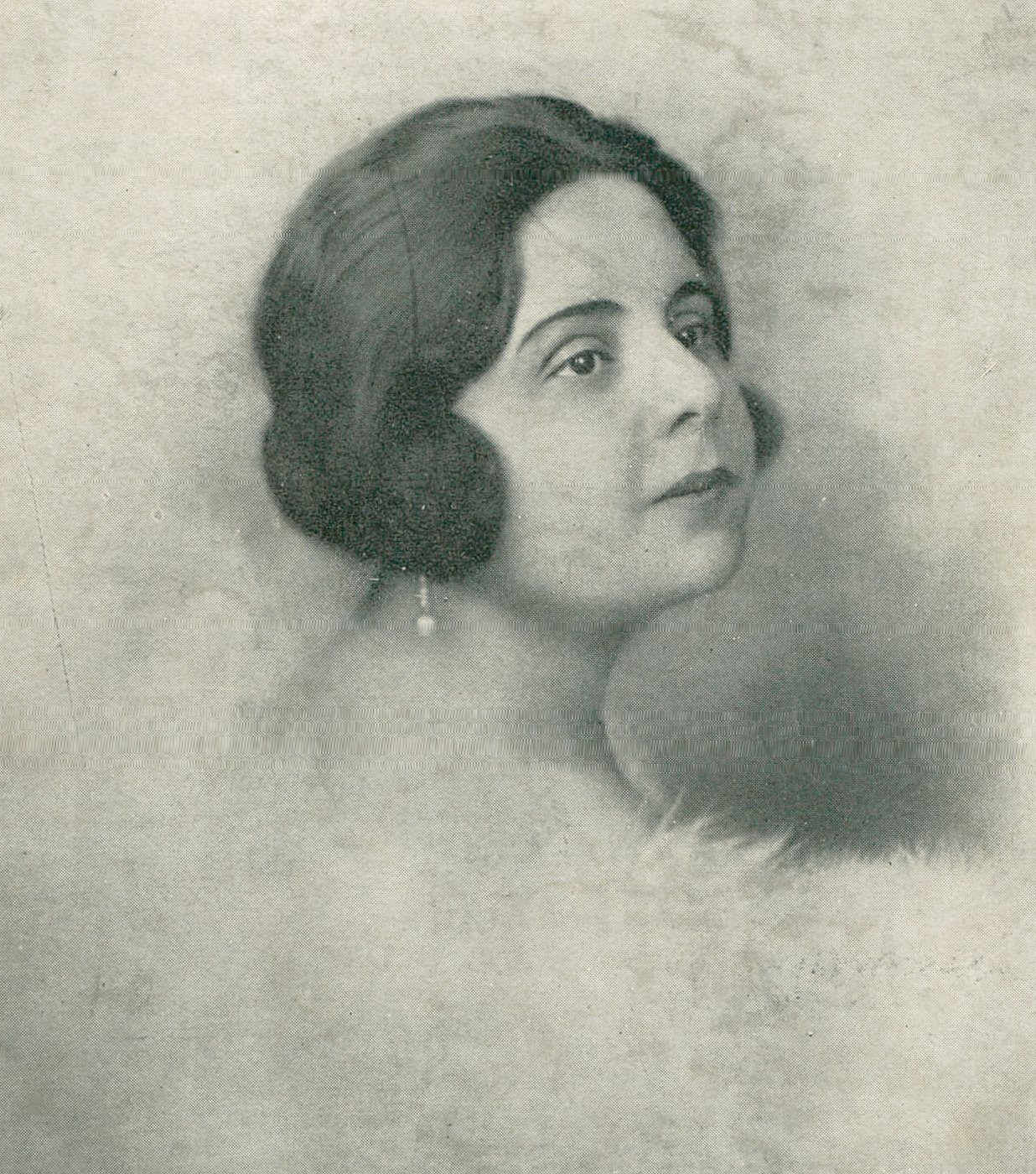
Sari

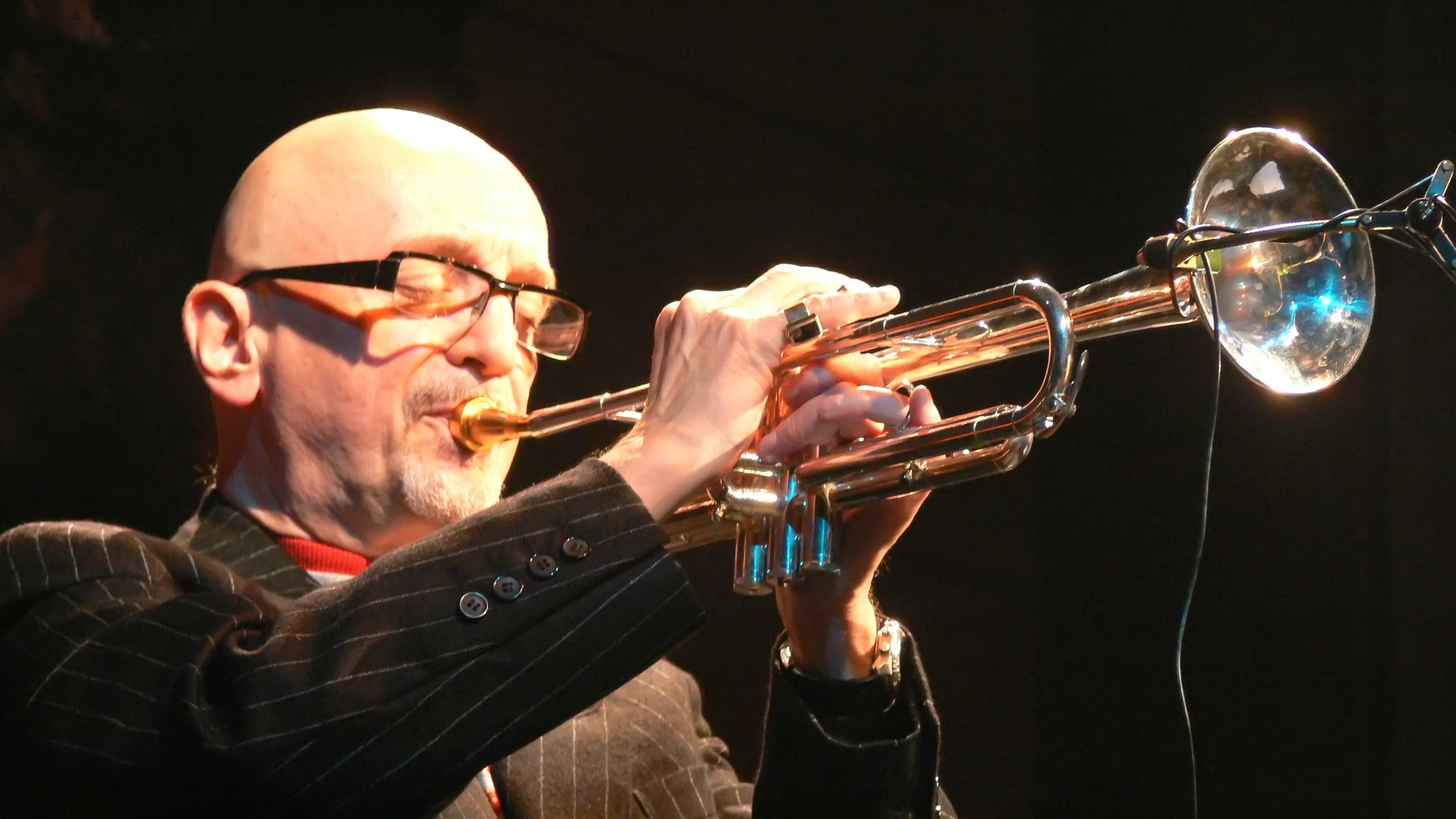
Stańko

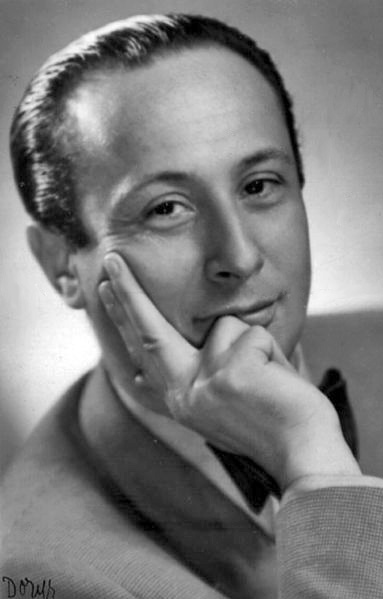
Szpilman

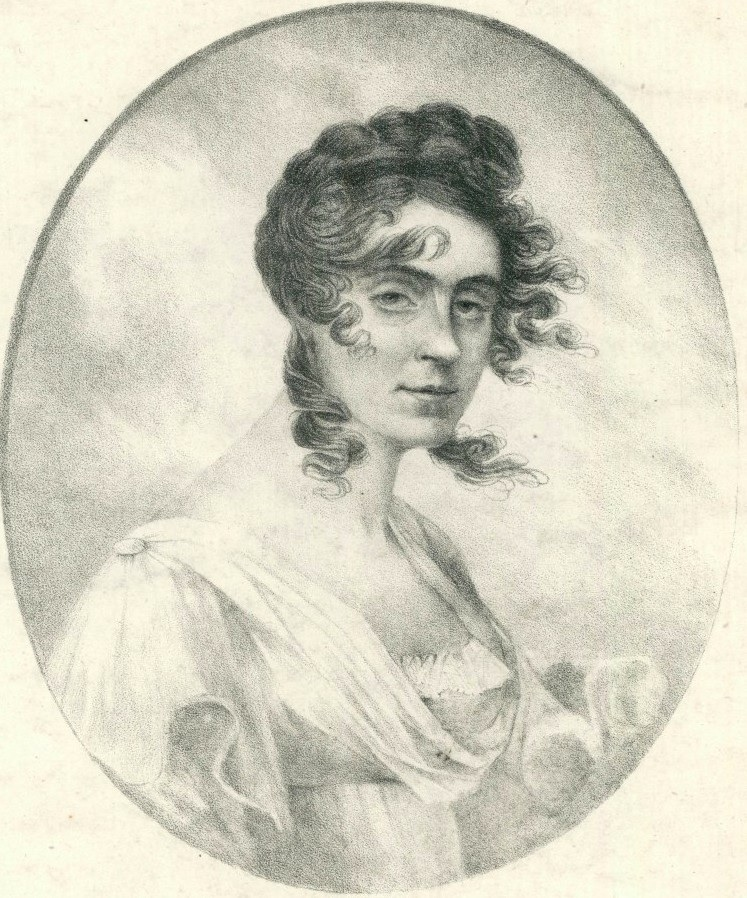
Szymanowska

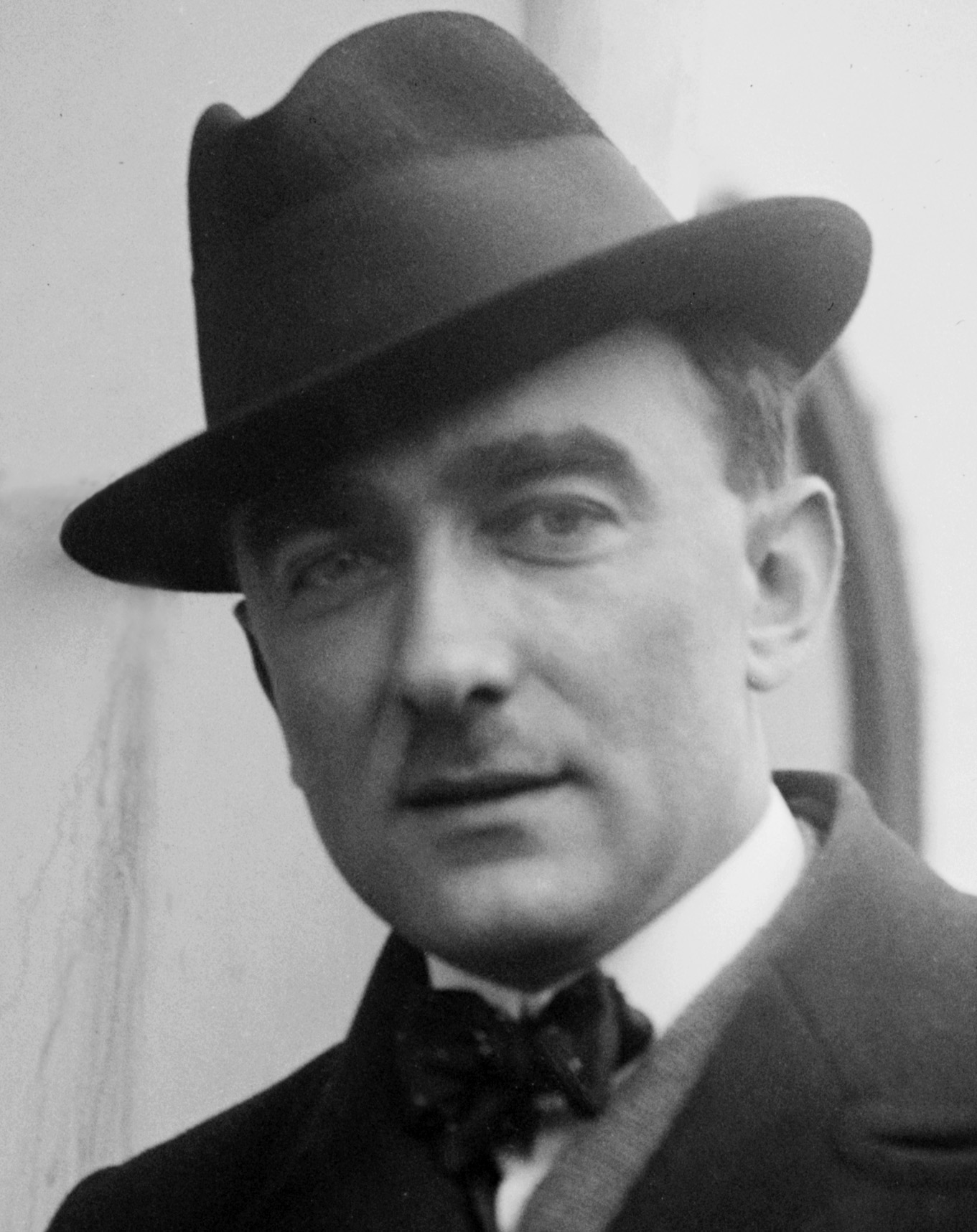
Szymanowski

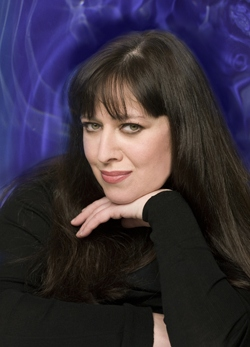
Trzetrzelewska ("Basia")

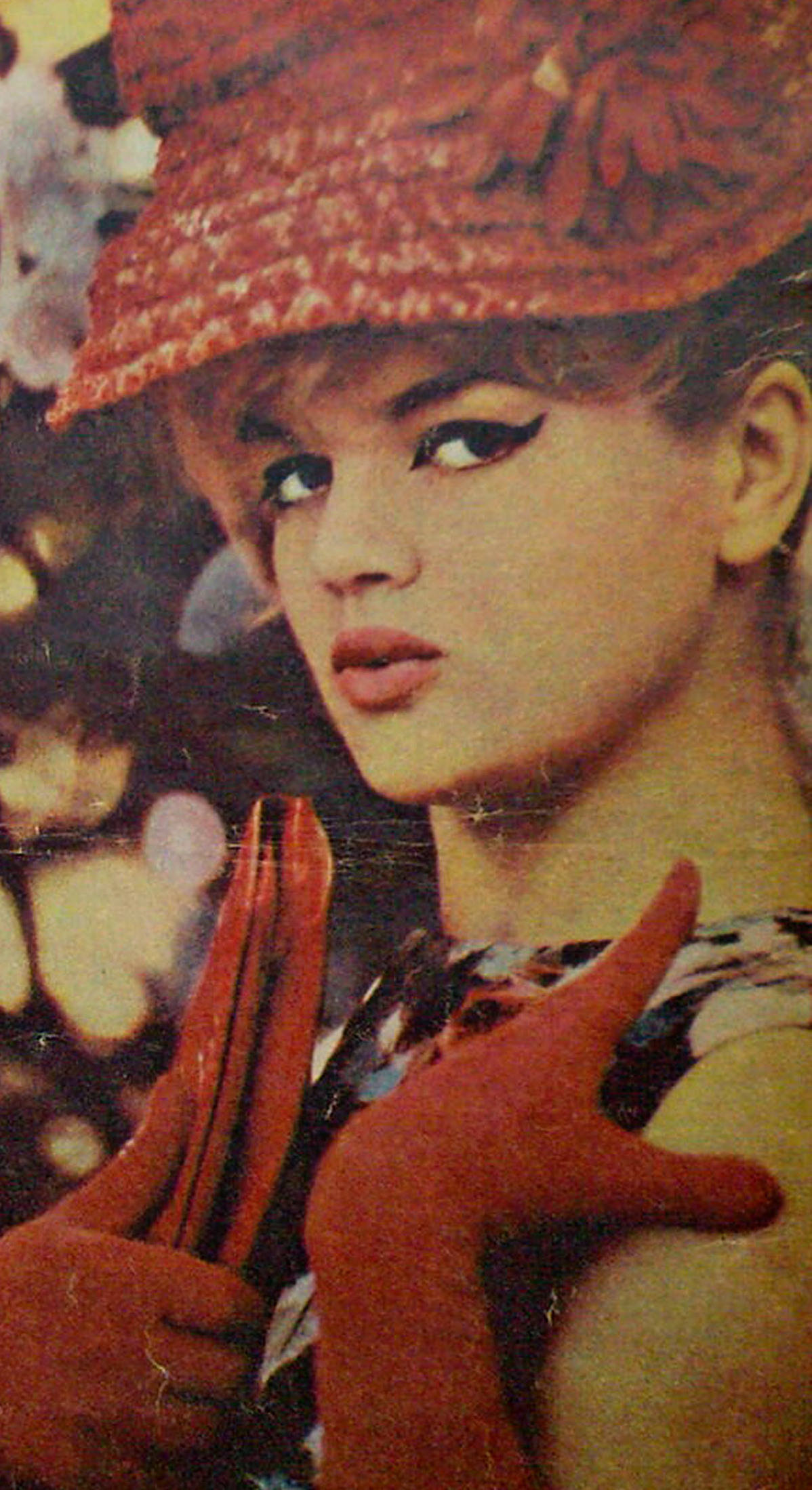
Villas

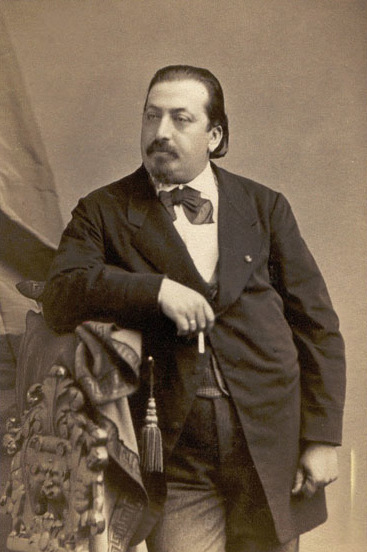
Wieniawski

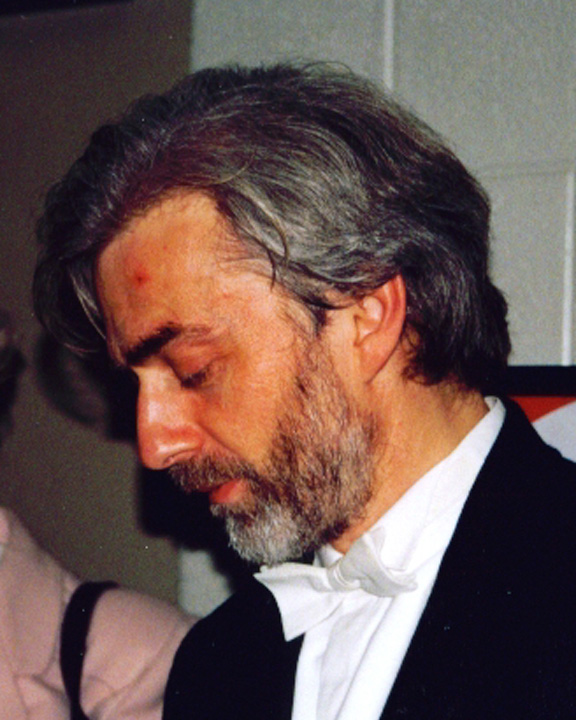
Zimerman

== Visual arts ==
- Magdalena Abakanowicz, sculptor
- Tadeusz Ajdukiewicz, painter
- Zygmunt Ajdukiewicz, painter
- Sylwester Ambroziak, sculptor
- Chrystian Piotr Aigner, architect
- Paweł Althamer, contemporary artist
- Michał Elwiro Andriolli (1836–93), illustrator, painter, architect
- Teodor Axentowicz, painter and rector of Krakow Academy of Fine Arts
- Marcello Bacciarelli, Italian-Polish portrait painter
- Tomasz Bagiński, computer graphics
- Balthus (Balthasar Kłossowski de Rola), Polish-French painter
- Mirosław Bałka, contemporary painter and sculptor
- Krzysztof Bednarski, sculptor
- Zdzisław Beksiński, painter
- Bernardo Bellotto, Italian-Polish landscape and court painter
- Władysław T. Benda, painter, illustrator, designer
- Henryka Beyer (1782–1855), painter
- Anna Bilińska-Bohdanowicz, painter
- Walerian Borowczyk, painter, lithographer and film director
- Olga Boznańska, painter
- Józef Brandt, battle-scene painter
- Maximilian Cercha, painter and drawer
- Jan Chełmiński (1851–1925), painter of historical and military subjects
- Józef Marian Chełmoński, painter
- Gerard Ciołek, architect and historian of gardens
- Józef Czapski, painter
- Tytus Czyżewski, painter, poet, art critic
- Jacenty Dędek, photographer
- Zbigniew Dłubak, painter
- Andrzej Dłużniewski, contemporary sculptor
- Karl Duldig (1902–1986)
- Xawery Dunikowski, sculptor
- Maksymilian Fajans, Jewish–Polish artist, lithographer, photographer
- Julian Fałat, painter
- Wojciech Fangor, painter
- Jakub Fontana, baroque and neoclassical architect
- Teodor and Franciszek Gajewski, sculptors and painters
- Wojciech Gerson, painter
- Stefan Gierowski, painter
- Aleksander Gierymski, painter, brother of Maksymilian Gierymski
- Maksymilian Gierymski, painter
- Paweł Giżycki, architect
- Cyprian Godebski, sculptor
- Chaim Goldberg, Painter, Sculptor and Engraver
- Zygmunt Gorgolewski, architect
- Józef Gosławski, sculptor and medallist
- Jadwiga Grabowska-Hawrylak, architect
- Artur Grottger, painter, illustrator
- Aleksander Gryglewski, interior portraits
- Władysław Hasior, sculptor, painter, stage designer
- Józef Hecht, engraver, printmaker
- Anton Hoffmann, 19th century architect in Bydgoszcz
- Józef Holewiński (1848–1917), graphic artist and painter
- Stanisław Horno-Popławski, painter, sculptor, pedagogue
- Władysław Horodecki, architect
- Ryszard Horowitz, photographer
- Maria Jarema, painter, sculptor
- Ewa Juszkiewicz, painter
- Anna Kamieńska-Łapińska, sculptor, animated-film scenarist
- Johann Christian Kammsetzer, architect
- Tadeusz Kantor (1915–1990), painter, theater director
- Rudolf Kern, Art Nouveau architect in Bydgoszcz
- Stefan Klajbor, architect
- Marta Klonowska, glass maker and sculptor
- Katarzyna Kobro, sculptor
- Roman Kochanowski, landscape painter
- Robert Konieczny, architect
- Gloria Kossak, painter, poet
- Jerzy Kossak, painter
- Juliusz Kossak, painter, illustrator
- Wojciech Kossak, painter
- Jan Kossowski, modernist architect
- Katarzyna Kozyra, video artist
- Lucjan Kraszewski, painter, photographer, illustrator; brother of Józef Ignacy Kraszewski
- Nikifor Krynicki, painter
- Alexander Kucharsky, painter
- Zofia Kulik, performer
- Stefan Kuryłowicz, architect
- Teofil Kwiatkowski, painter
- Tamara de Lempicka, painter
- Zbigniew Lengren, cartoonist and illustrator
- Jan Lenica, graphic designer and cartoonist
- Stanisław Lentz, painter
- Aleksander Lesser, painter
- Daniel Libeskind, architect
- Bronisław Linke, graphic artist, painter of the horror of war
- Mieczysław Lubelski, sculptor, ceramicist and creator of the Polish War Memorial
- Władysław Łuszczkiewicz, painter
- Tadeusz Makowski, painter member of Paris School
- Jacek Malczewski, painter
- Rafał Malczewski, painter, writer, climber
- Kazimierz Malewicz, painter, founder of Suprematism
- Stanisław Masłowski, painter
- Jan Matejko, painter
- Agata Materowicz, painter, photographer, graphic designer, FIMO figurines designer and hand-maker
- Józef Mehoffer, painter
- Piotr Michałowski, painter
- Jacek Mierzejewski, painter
- Jerzy Mierzejewski, painter and pedagogue
- Ambroży Mieroszewski, Chopin's first portraitist
- Igor Mitoraj, sculptor
- Dorota Nieznalska, sculptor
- Nikifor, naive artist of Lemko origin
- Jan Piotr Norblin, painting, drawing, caricature
- Jerzy Nowosielski, painter
- Seweryn Obst (1847–1917), painter, illustrator, ethnographer
- Rafał Olbiński, illustrator, painter
- Roman Opałka, painter
- Aleksander Orłowski, painter
- Stanisław Julian Ostroróg, early portrait photographer, known as "Walery"
- Stanisław Julian Ignacy Ostroróg, celebrated photographer son of the other Ostroróg
- Józef Pankiewicz, painter, graphic artist
- Aniela Pawlikowska, portrait painter
- Maximilian Piotrowski, painter and professor at the Academy of Fine Arts in Königsberg
- Władysław Podkowiński, painter and illustrator
- Józef Pokutyński, architect
- Peter Potworowski, painter
- Stanislaw Przespolewski, painter, sculptor
- Anna Rajecka, 18th-century portrait painter
- Joanna Rajkowska, contemporary artist; designer of Warsaw's artificial palm tree
- Zofia Romer, painter
- Ferdynand Ruszczyc, painter, graphic artist, cartoonist, stage designer
- Henryk Rodakowski, painter
- Władysław Sadłowski, architect
- Wilhelm Sasnal, painter
- Jan Sawka, painter, print-maker, architect, graphic designer, multi-media artist
- Johann Christian Schuch, garden designer, architect
- Kazimierz Sichulski, painter
- Władysław Sławny, photographer
- Jan Stanisławski, painter
- Henryk Stażewski, painter
- Zofia Stryjeńska, illustrator, painter
- Władysław Strzemiński, painter
- January Suchodolski, painter
- Józef Święcicki, 19th century architect
- Józef Szajna, sculptor, stage designer, theatre director
- Stanisław Szukalski, sculptor, painter
- Arthur Szyk, illuminator, war cartoonist, book illustrator
- Wacław Szymanowski, painter, sculptor, designer of Frederic Chopin Monument in Warsaw
- Teodor Talowski, architect
- Włodzimierz Tetmajer, painter
- Franciszka Themerson, painter, illustrator, stage designer
- Stanisław Tondos, painter
- Feliks Topolski, expressionist painter and draughtsman
- Roland Topor, illustrator, painter, writer and filmmaker
- Piotr Triebler, sculptor
- Armand Vetulani, art historian and art critic
- Zygmunt Vogel, watercolor and drawing
- Marian Walentynowicz, illustrator and comic strip pioneer
- Walenty Wańkowicz, painter
- Max Weber, painter
- Fritz Weidner, designer and architect in Bydgoszcz
- Michał Weinzieher, art critic
- Wojciech Weiss, painter and draughtsman
- Jan de Weryha-Wysoczański, sculptor
- Alfred Wierusz-Kowalski, painter
- Stanisław Witkiewicz, painter, architect
- Stanisław Ignacy Witkiewicz (Witkacy), painter, photographer, playwright, novelist, philosopher
- Kazimierz Wojniakowski, painter
- Leon Wyczółkowski, painter
- Stanisław Wyspiański, painter
- August Zamoyski, sculptor
- Jerzy Zaruba, graphic artist, caricaturist, stage designer
- Jan Sas Zubrzycki, architect
- Marek Zulawski, painter and art theorist
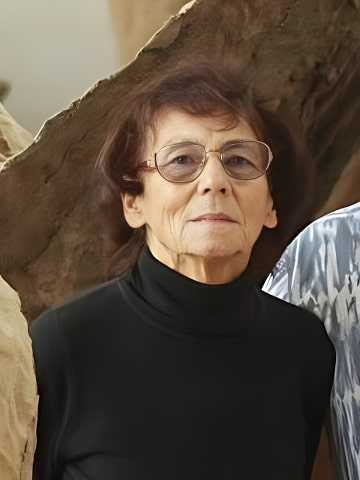
Abakanowicz

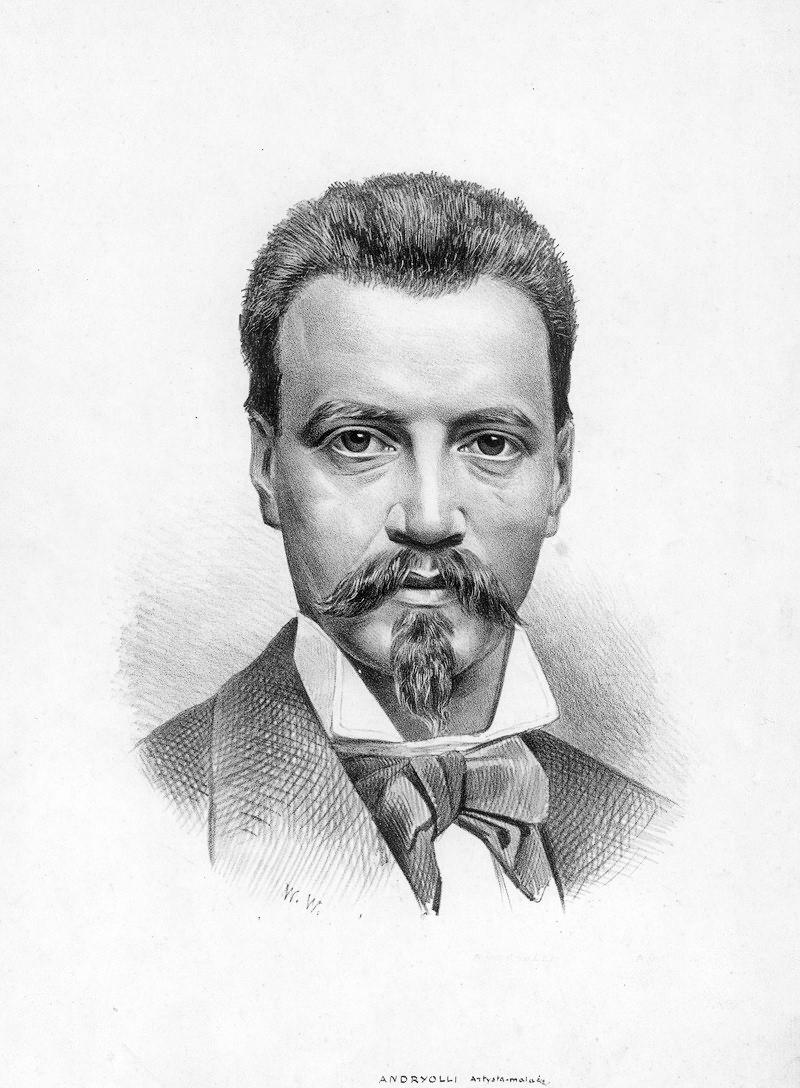
Andriolli

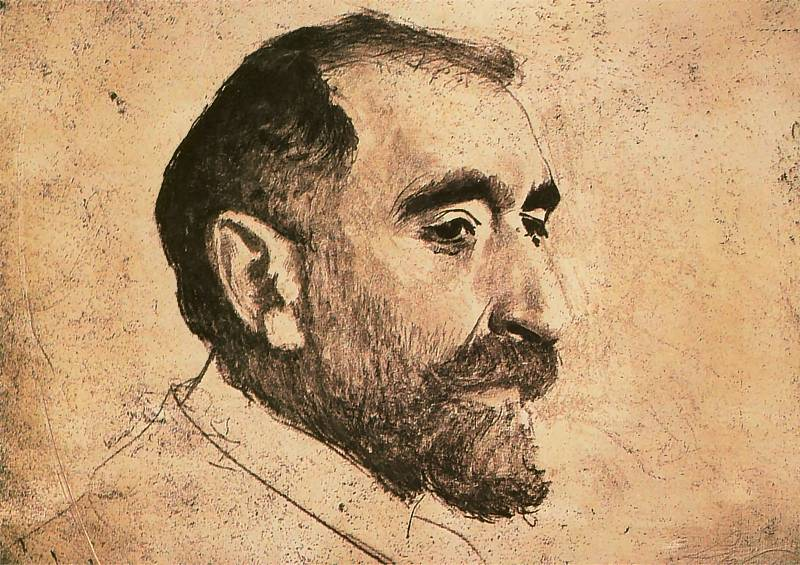
Axentowicz

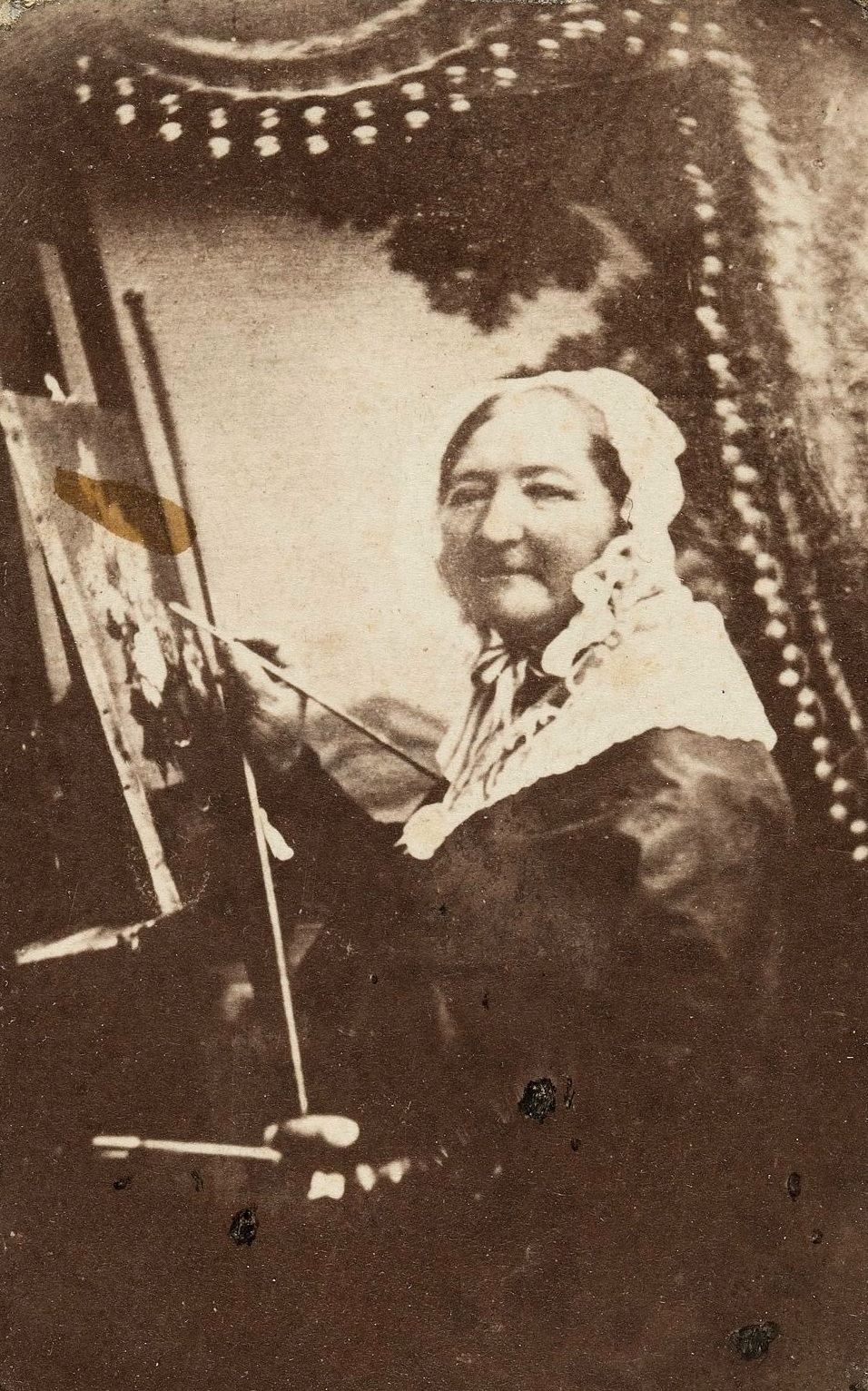
Beyer

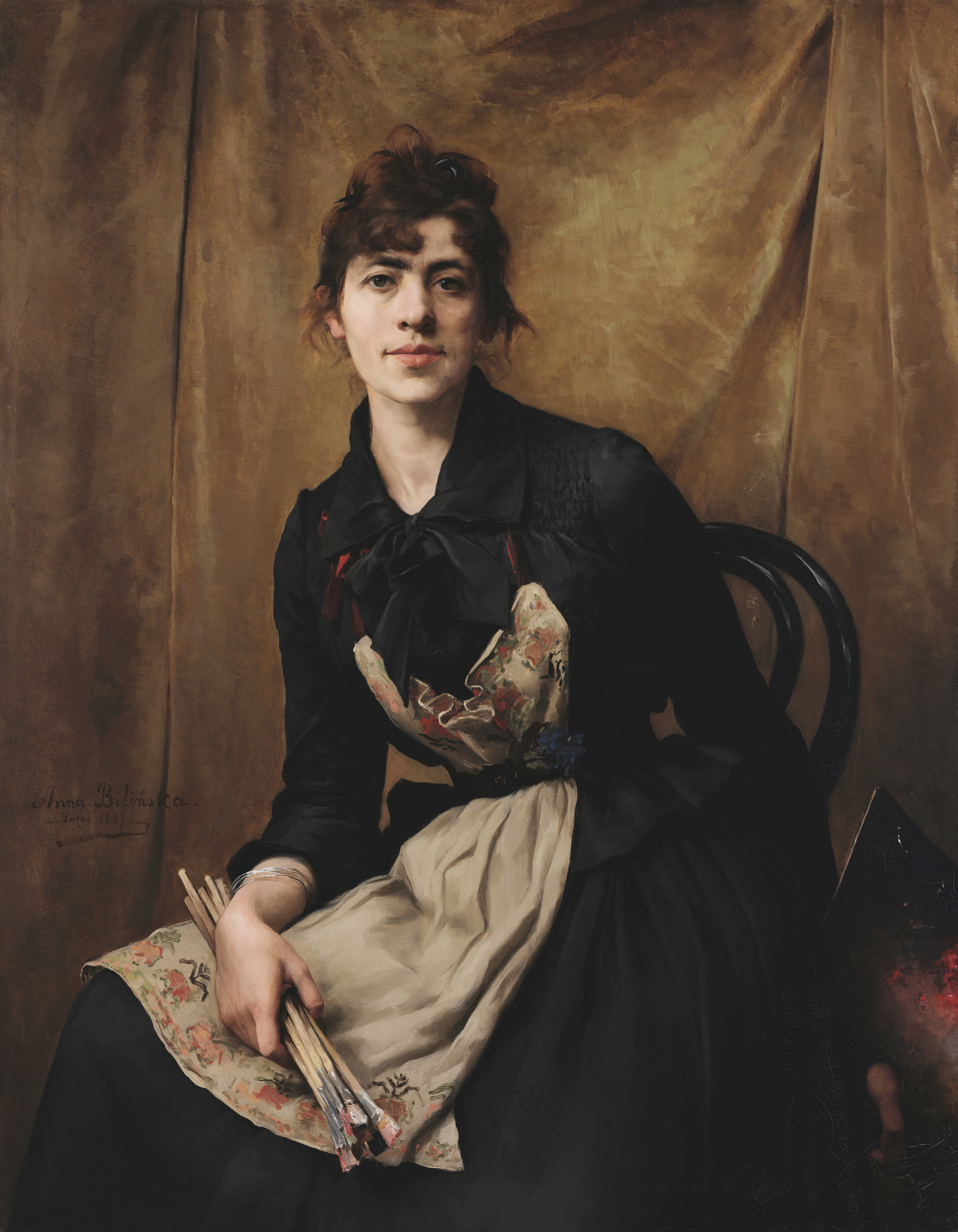
Bilińska

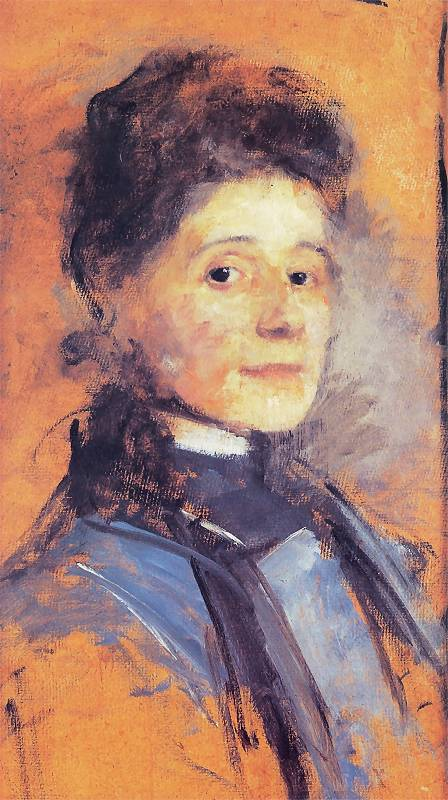
Boznańska

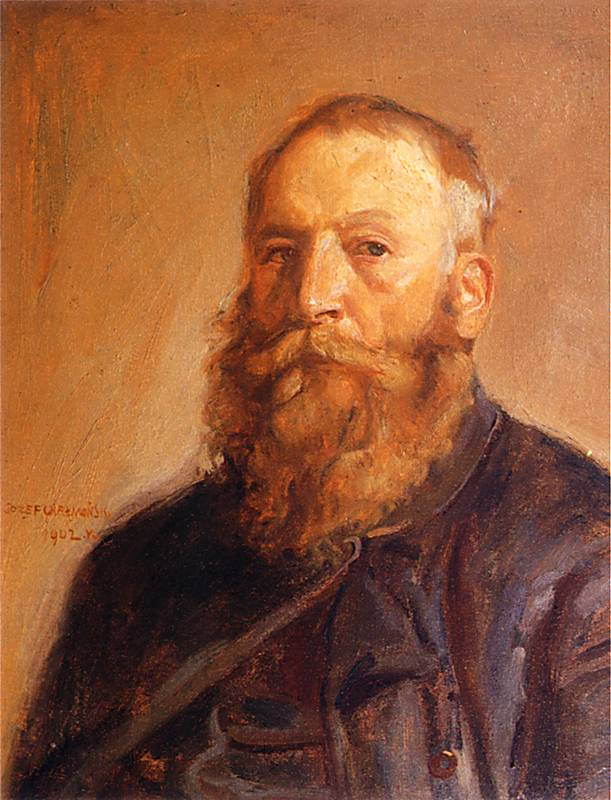
Chełmoński

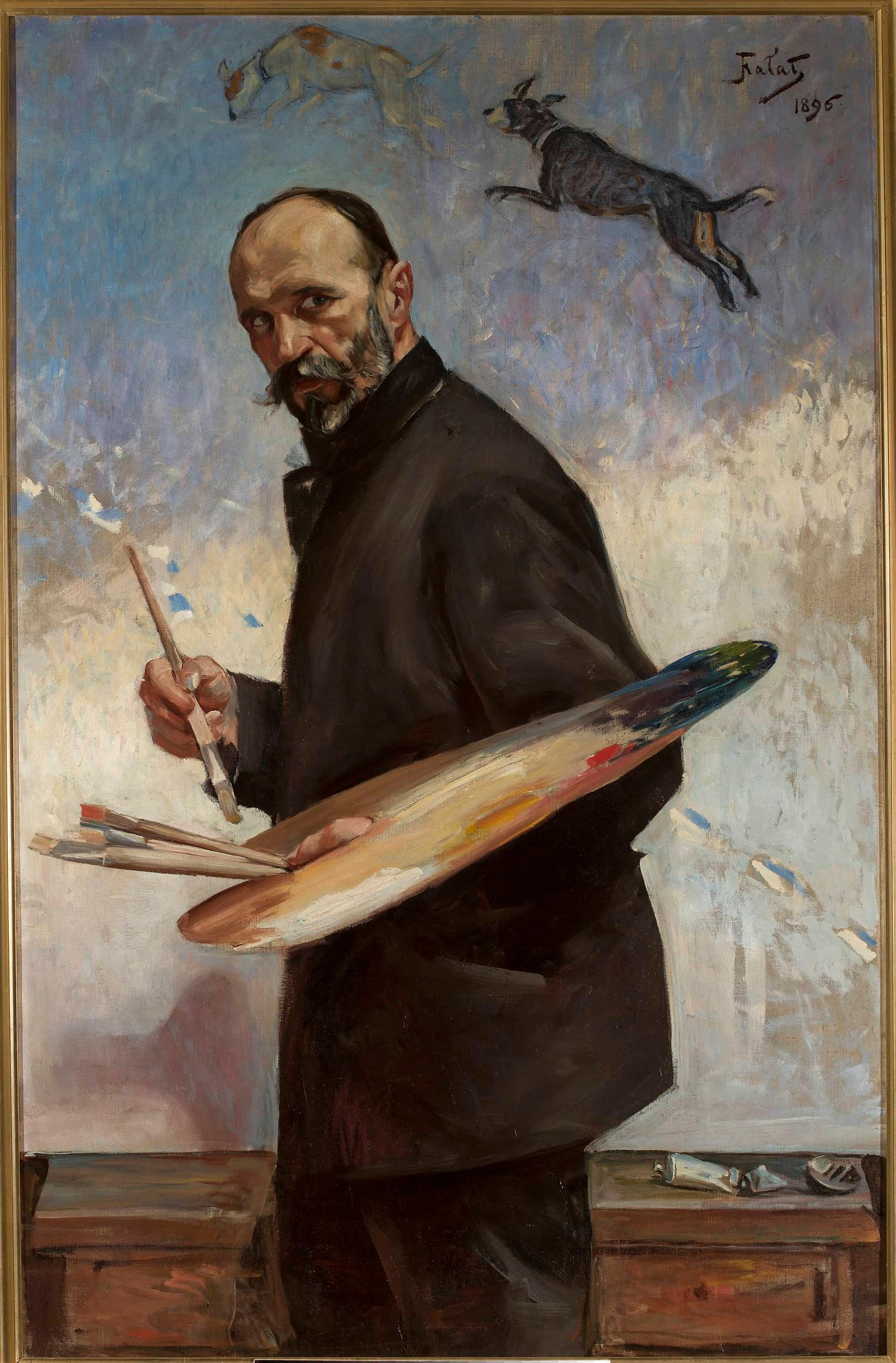
Fałat

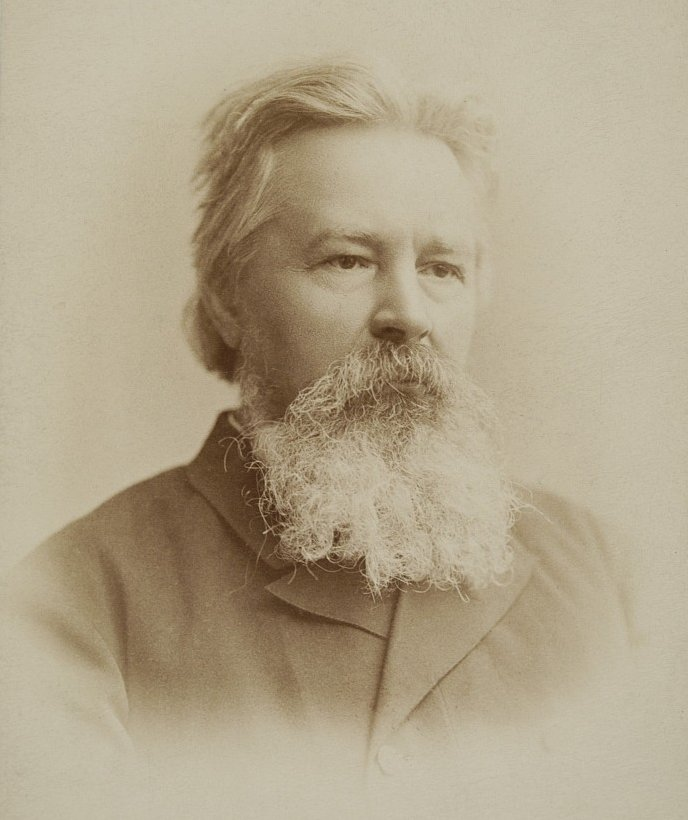
Gerson

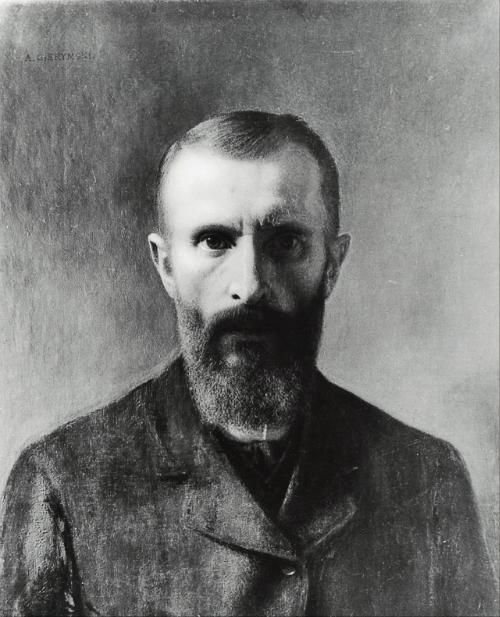
Gierymski

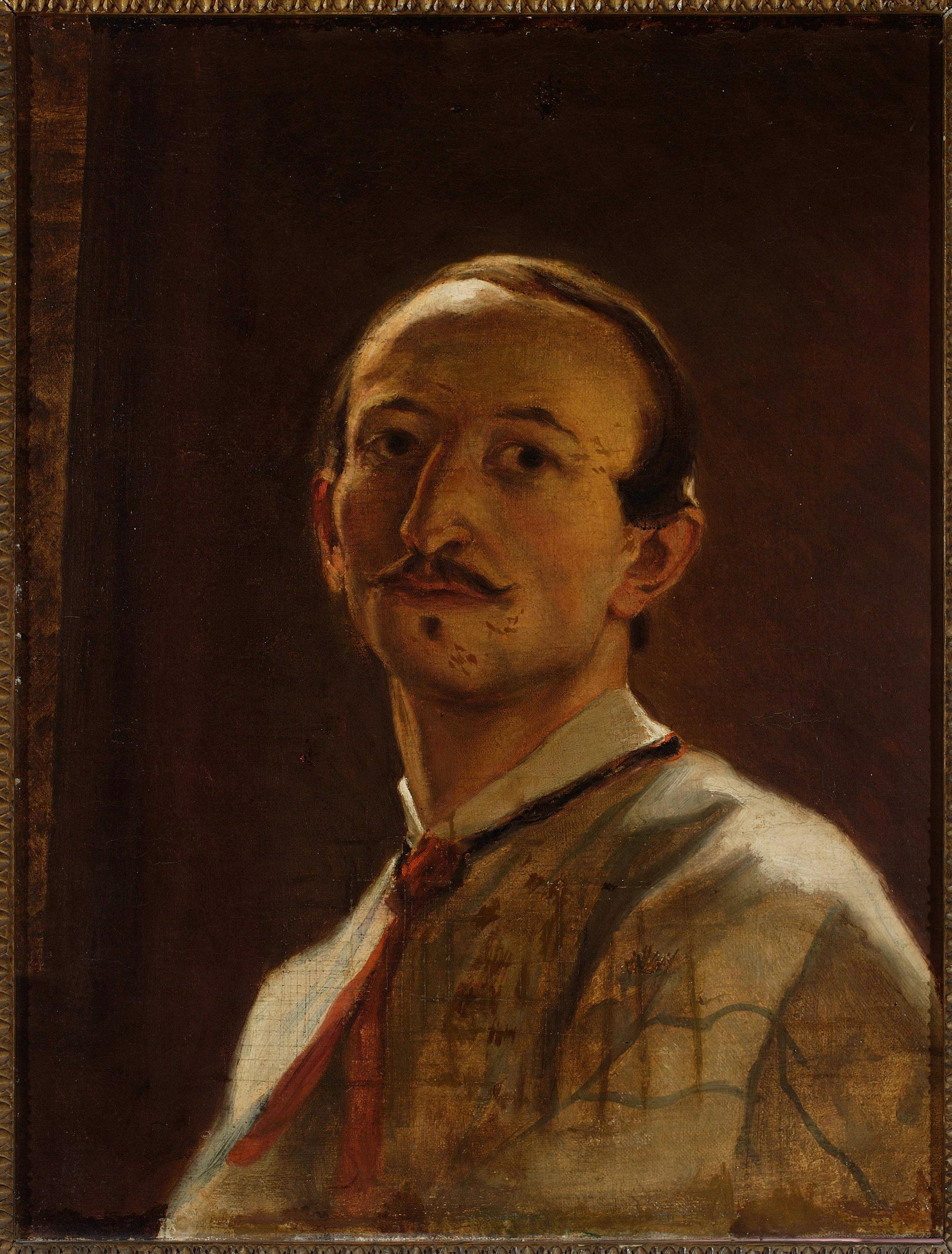
Grottger

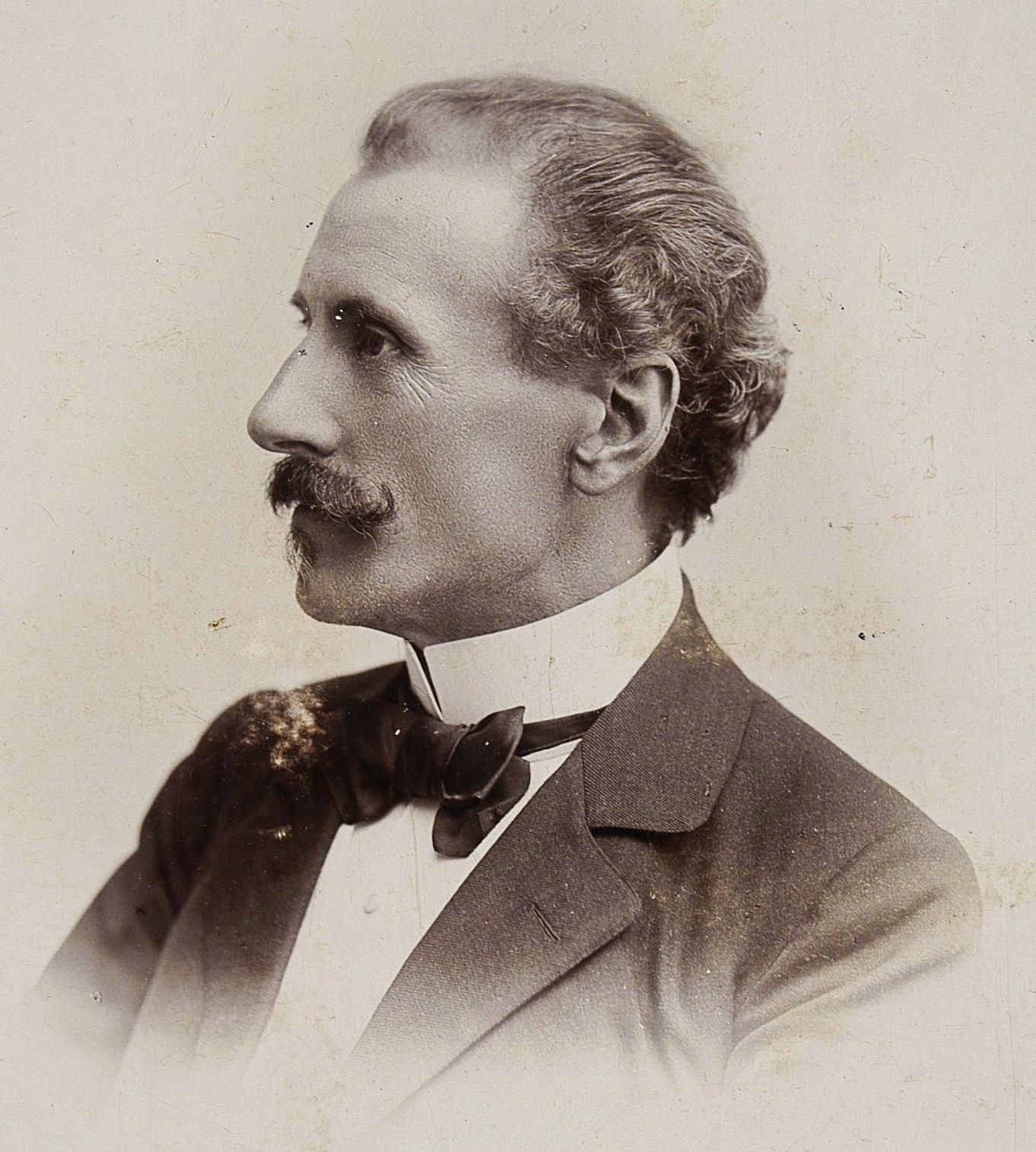
Holewiński

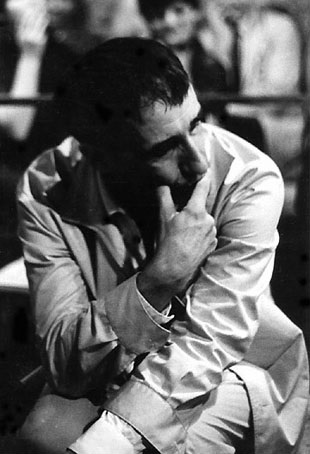
Kantor

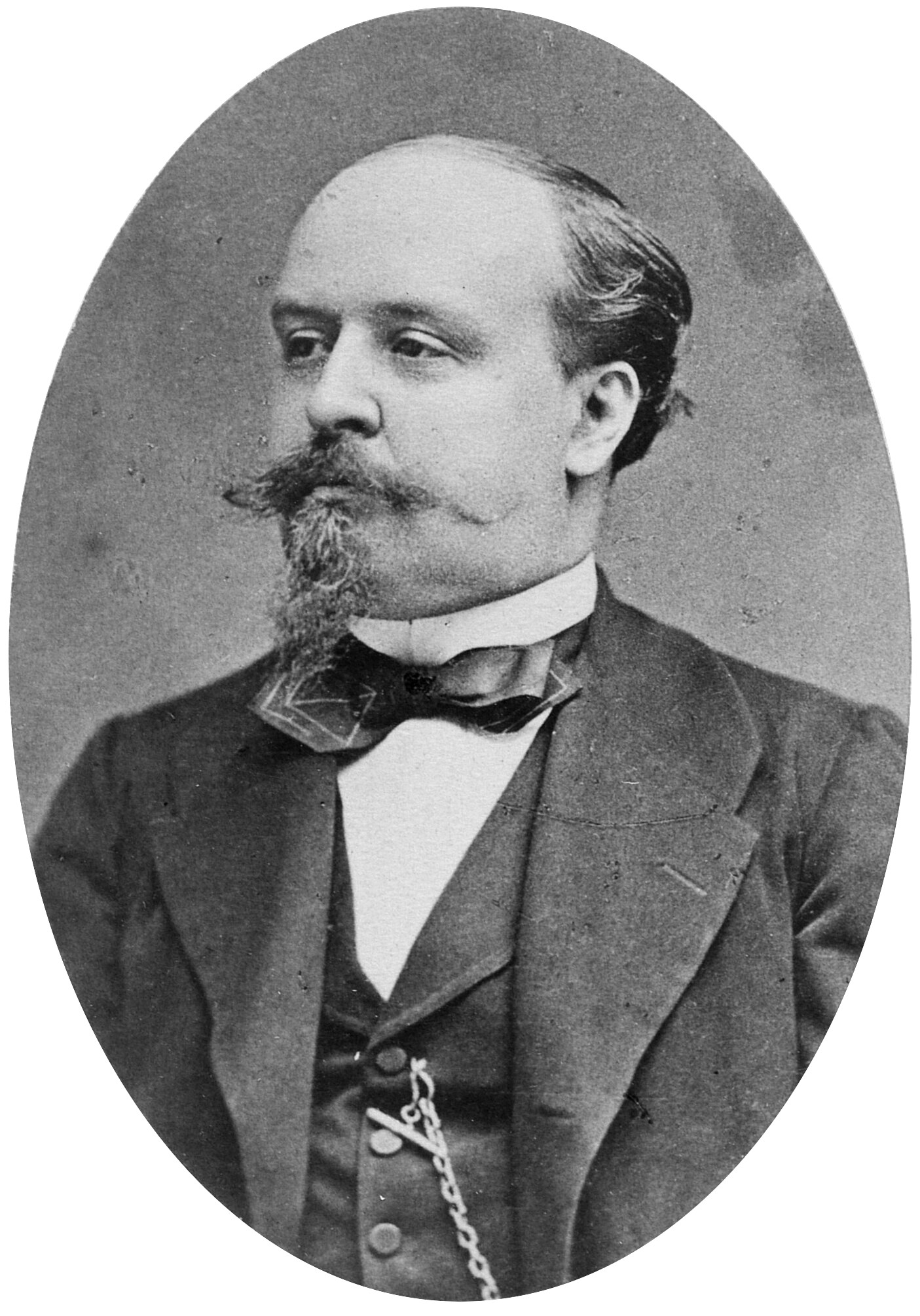
Juliusz Kossak

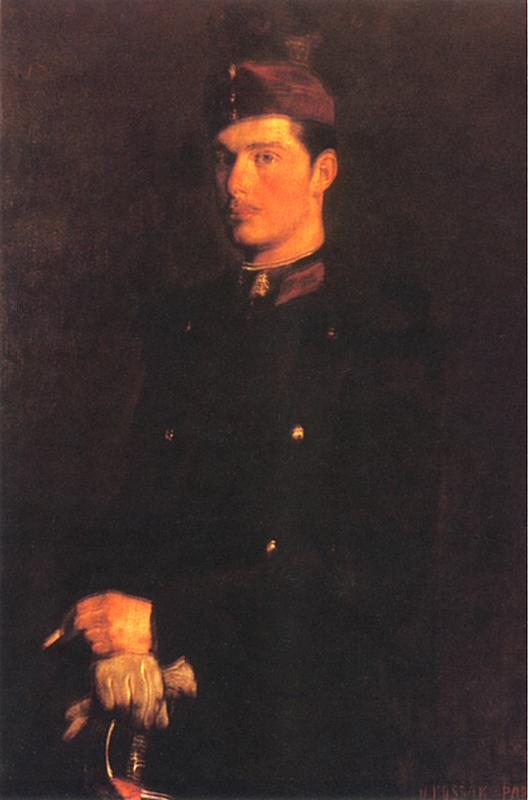
Wojciech Kossak

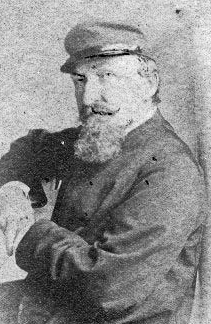
Lucjan Kraszewski

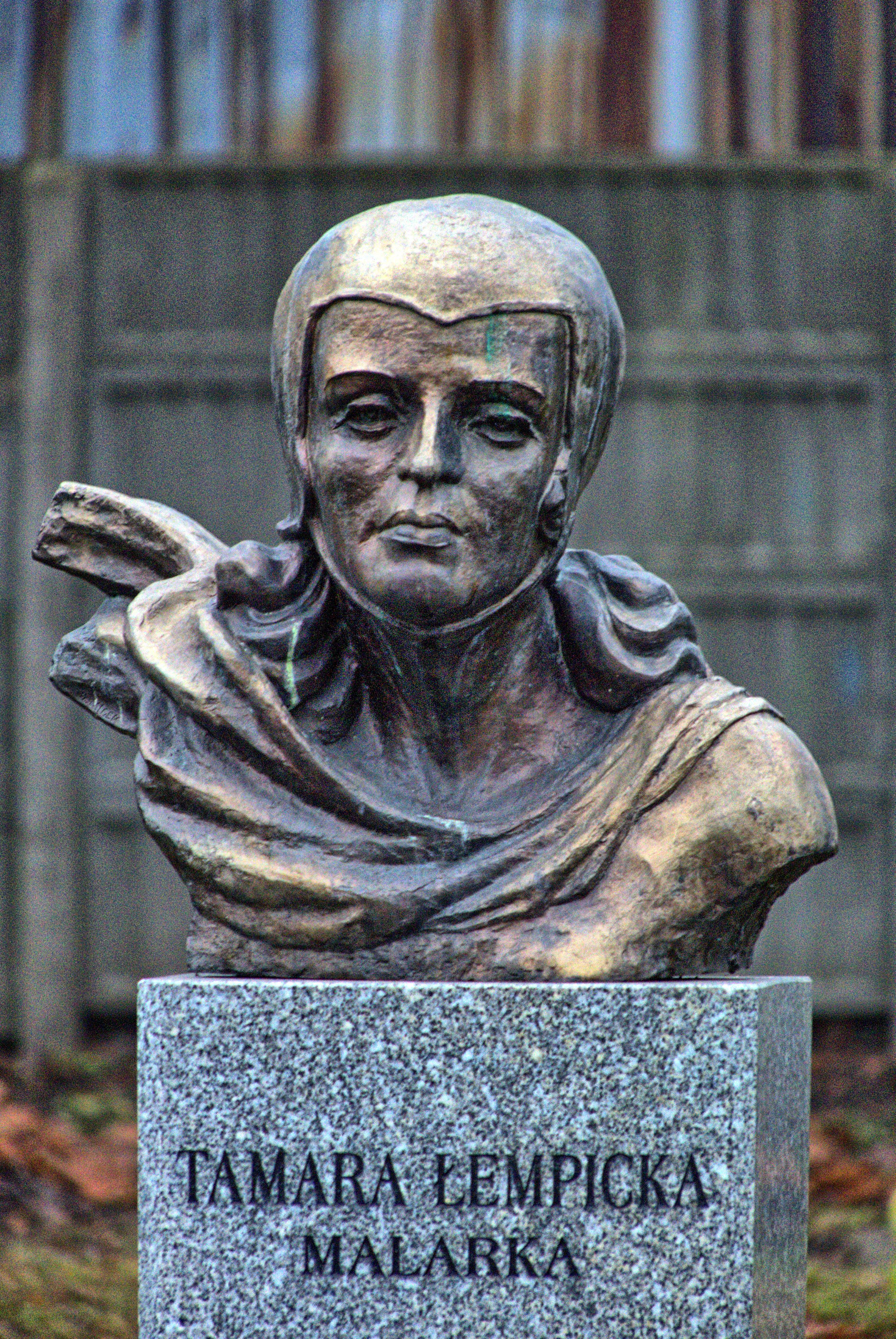
Lempicka

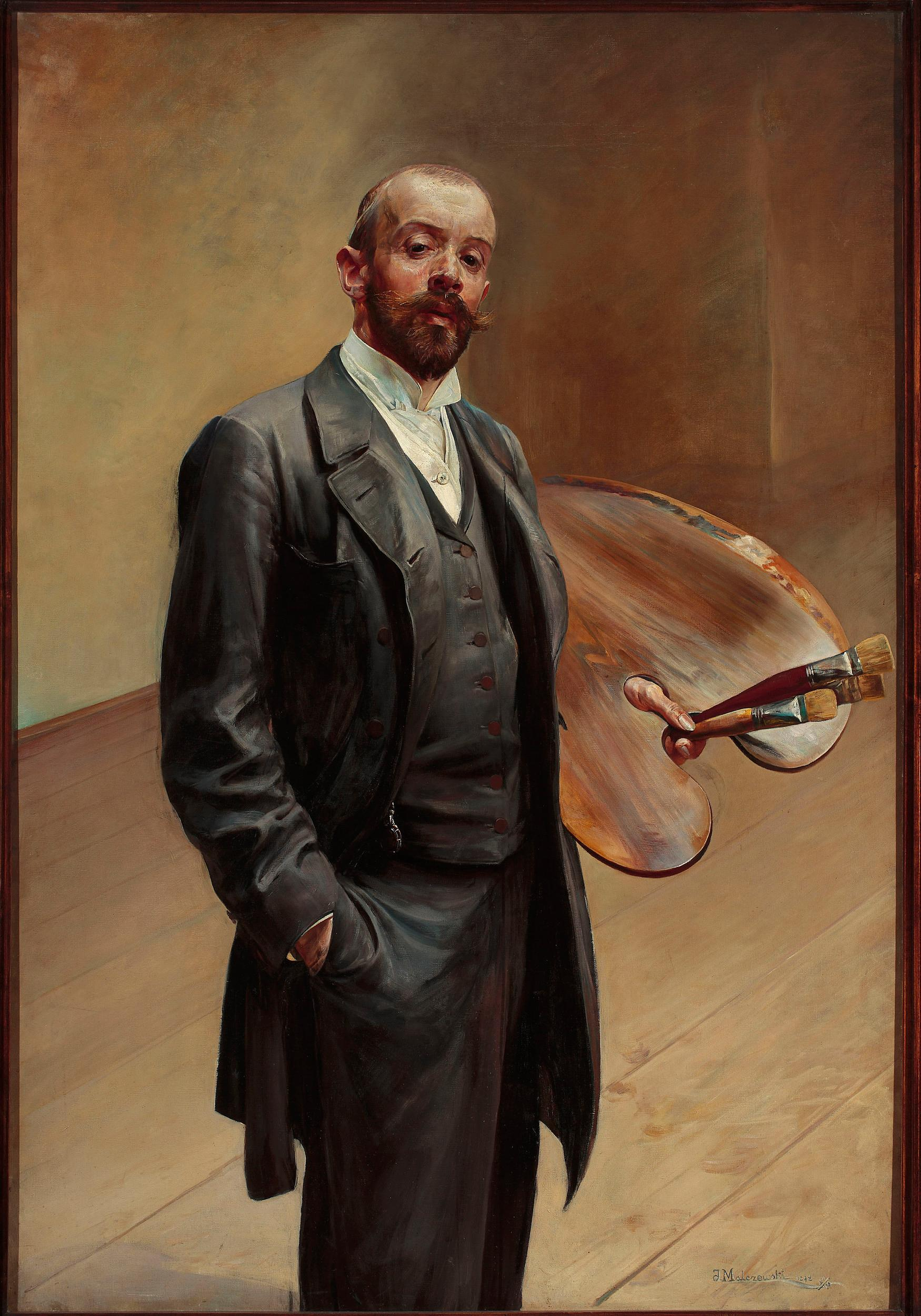
Malczewski

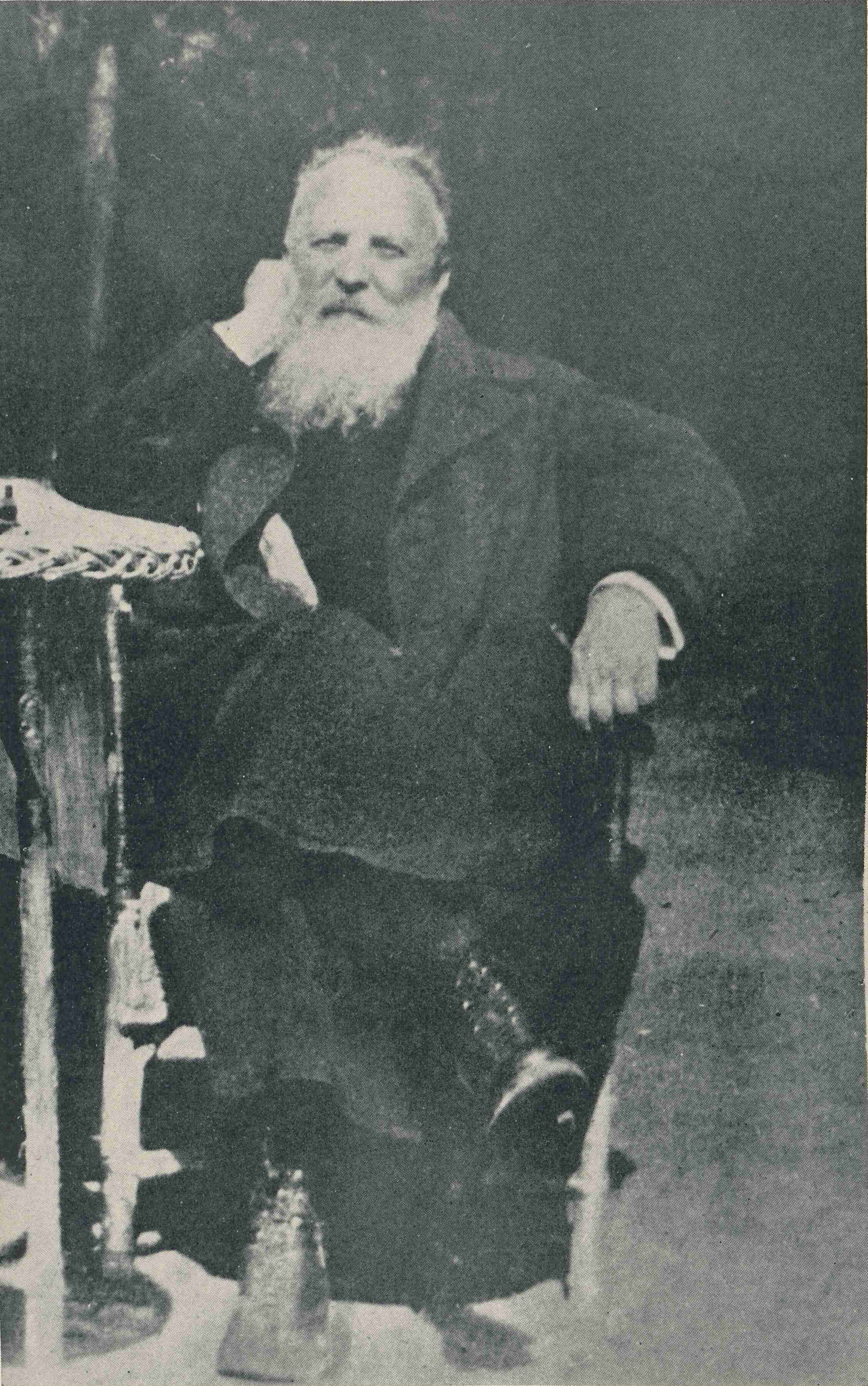
Masłowski

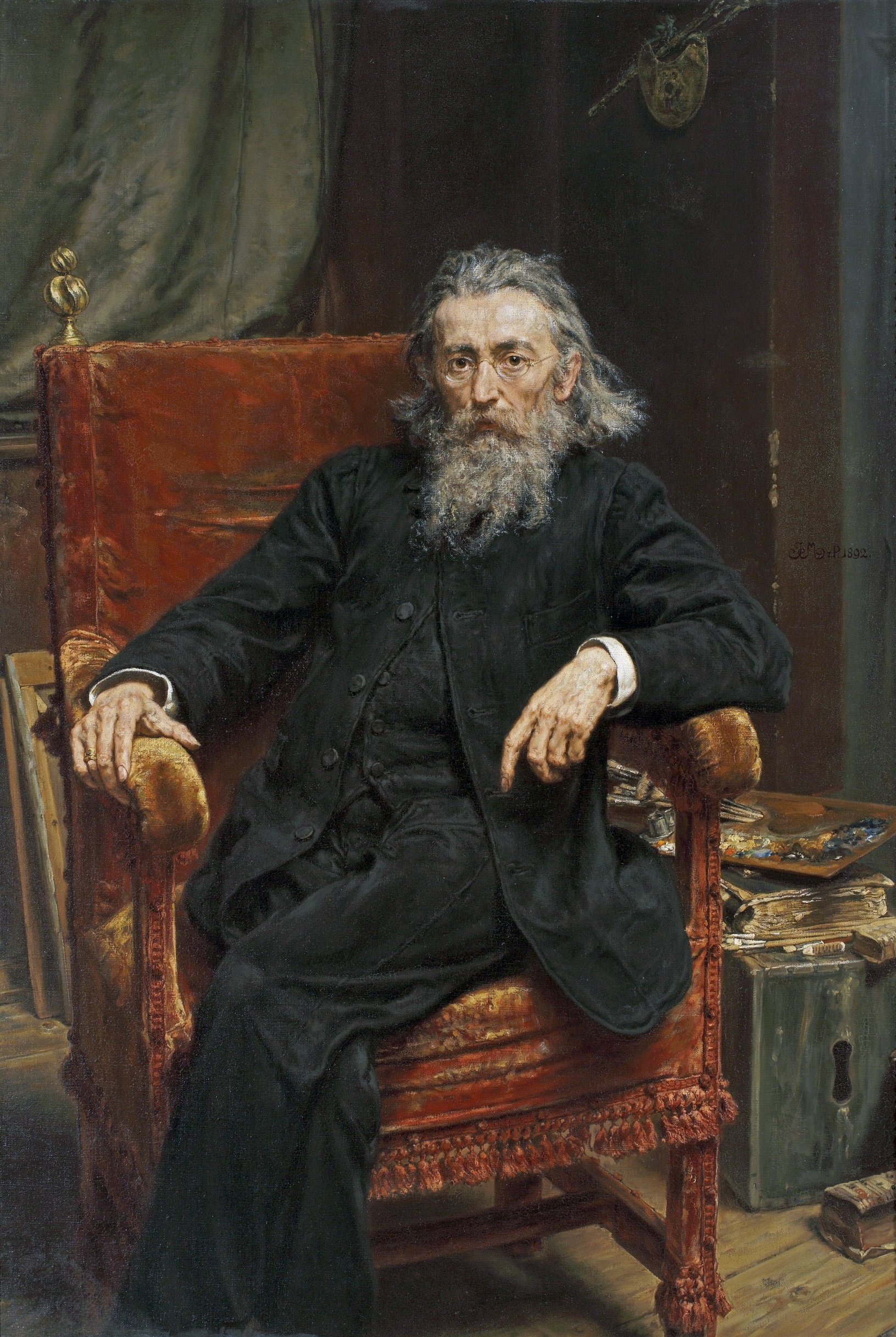
Matejko

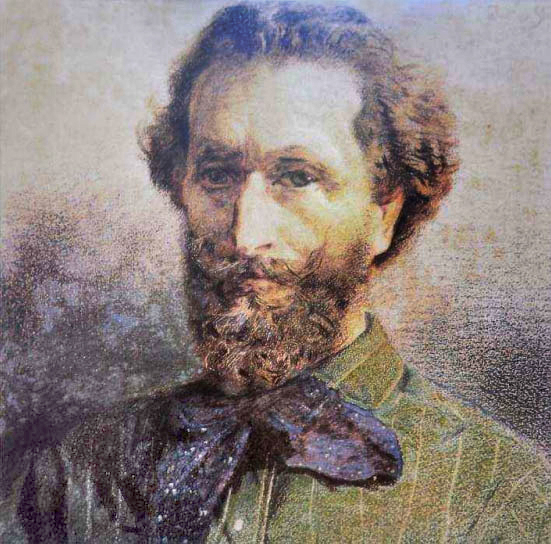
Obst

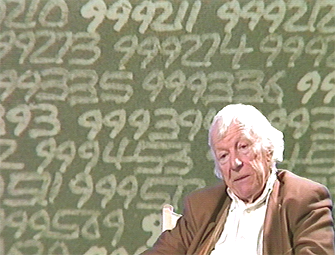
Opałka

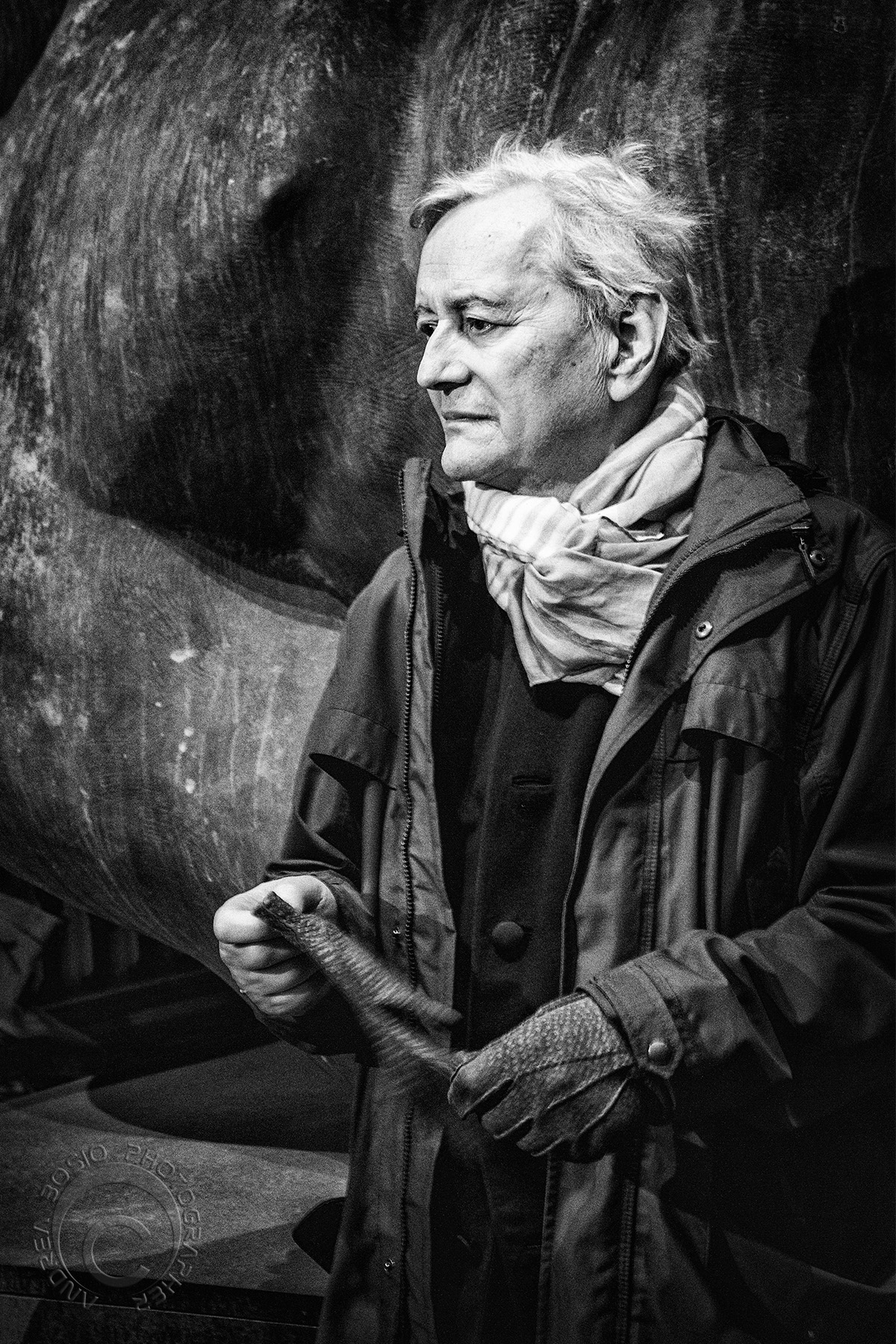
Mitoraj

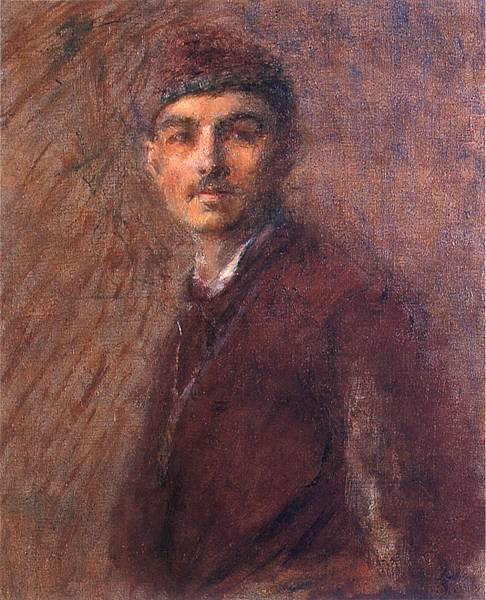
Podkowiński

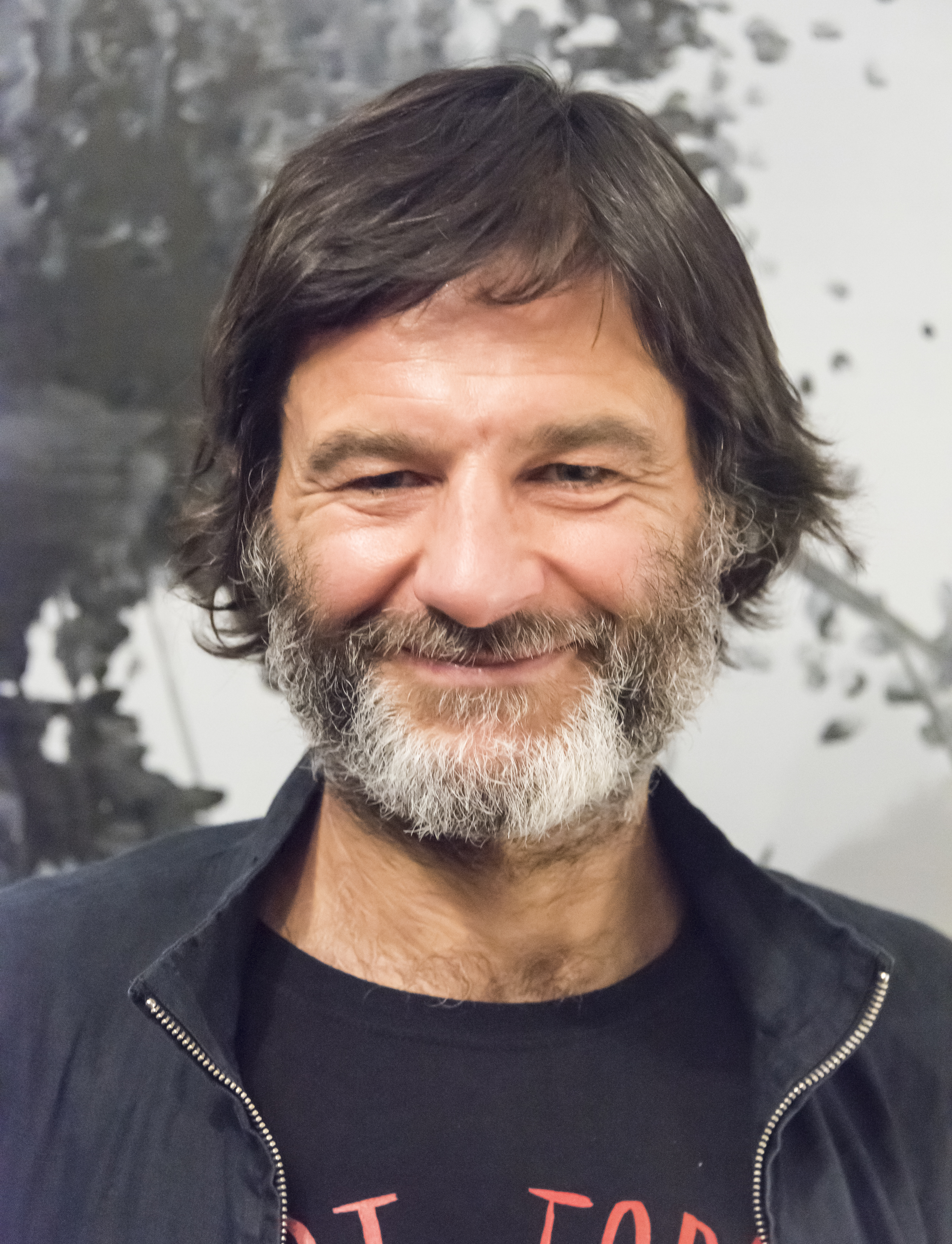
Sasnal

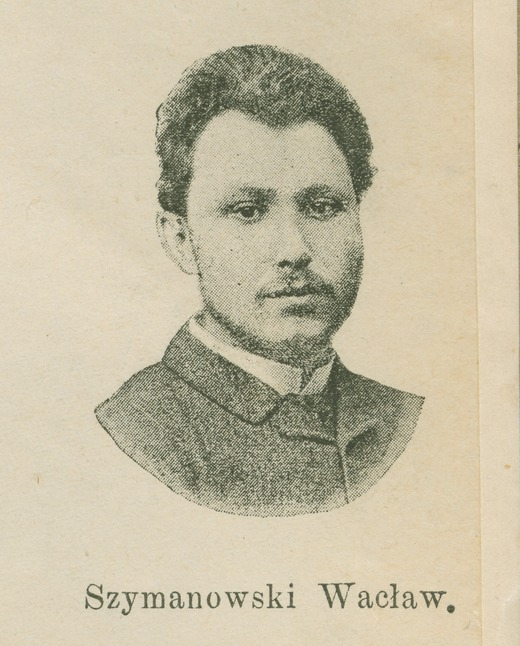
Szymanowski

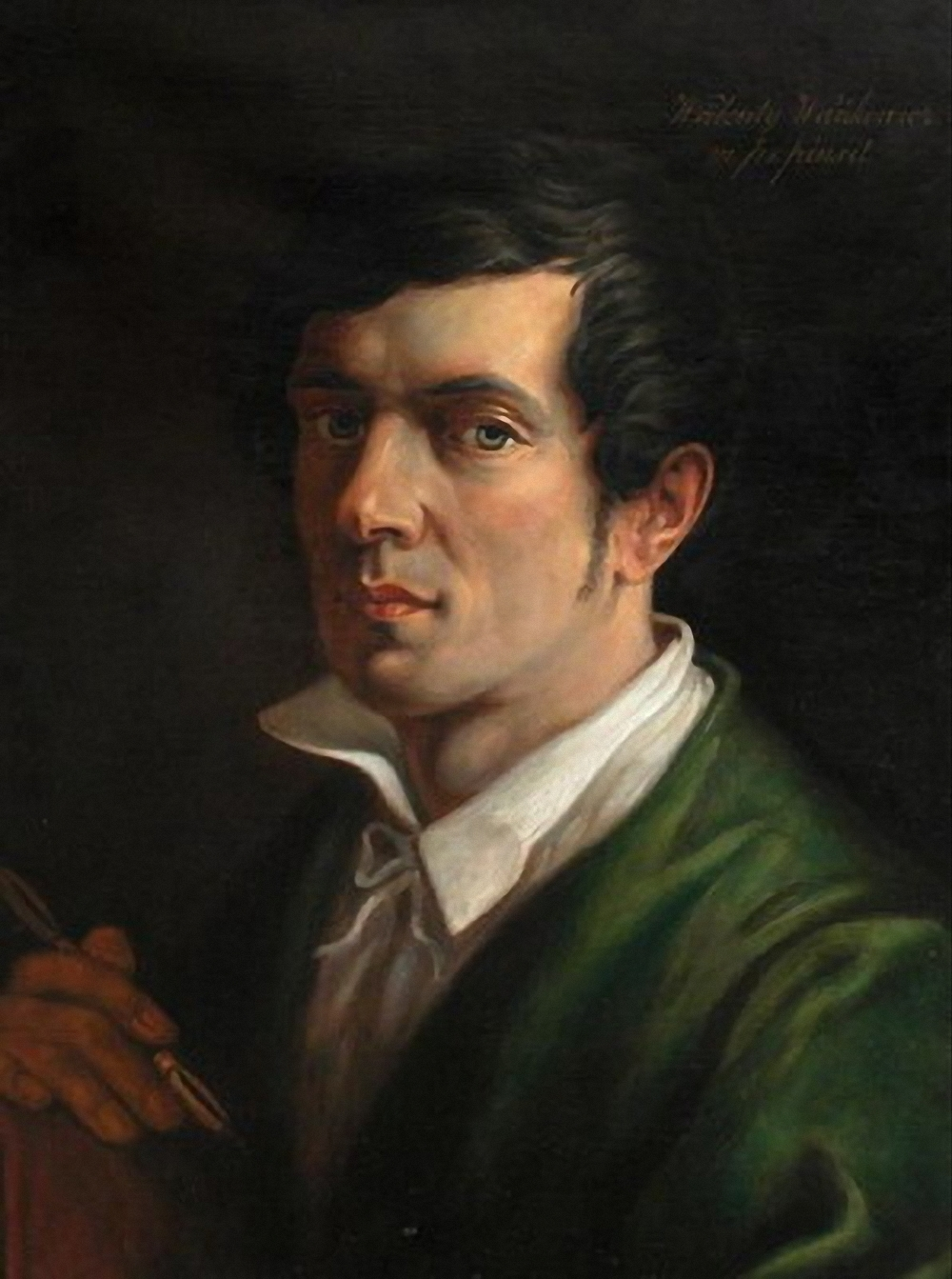
Wańkowicz

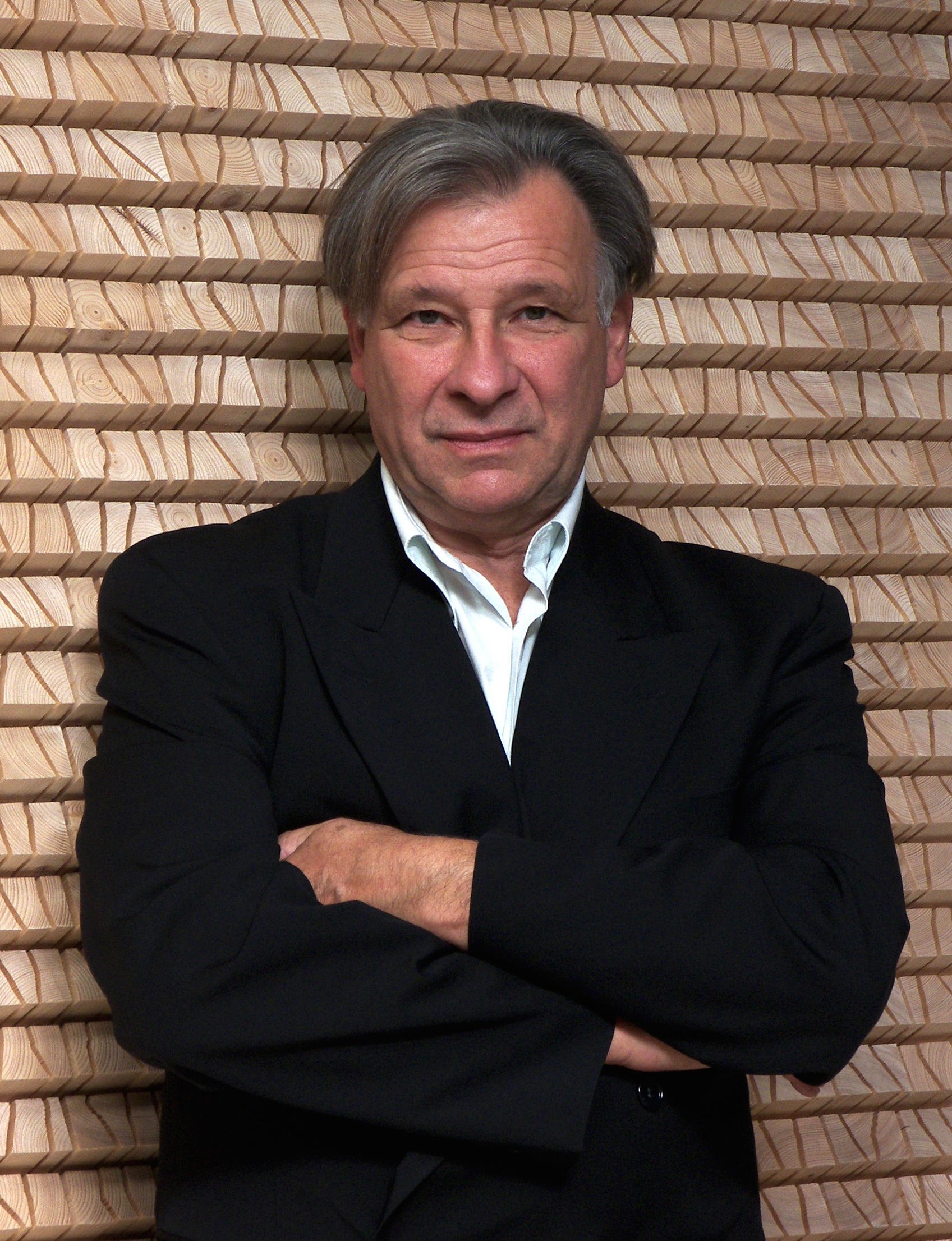
de Weryha-Wysoczański

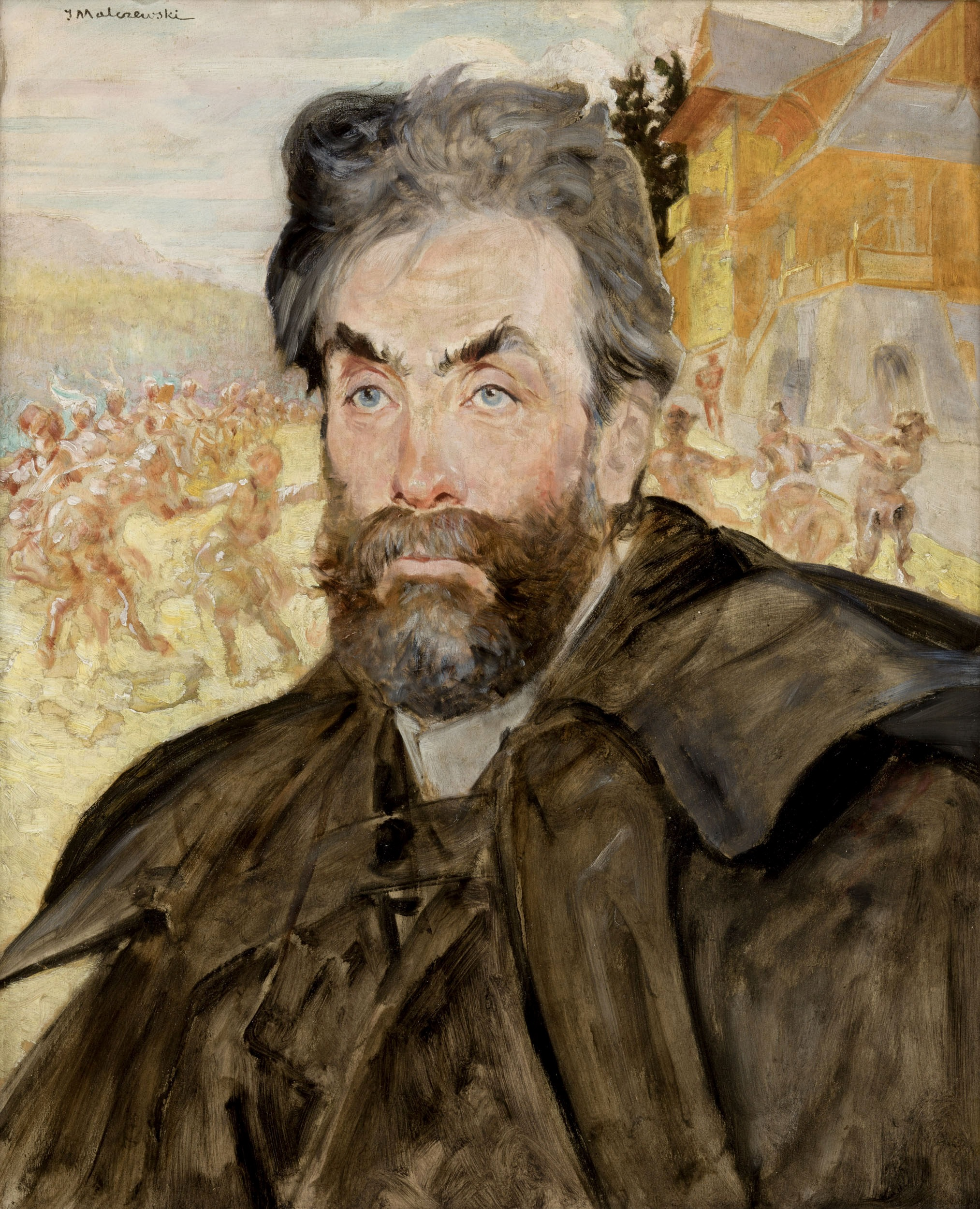
Witkiewicz

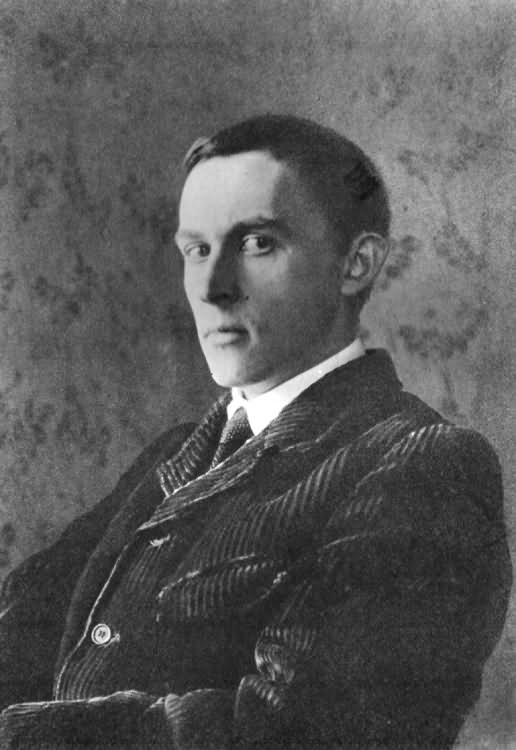
Witkacy

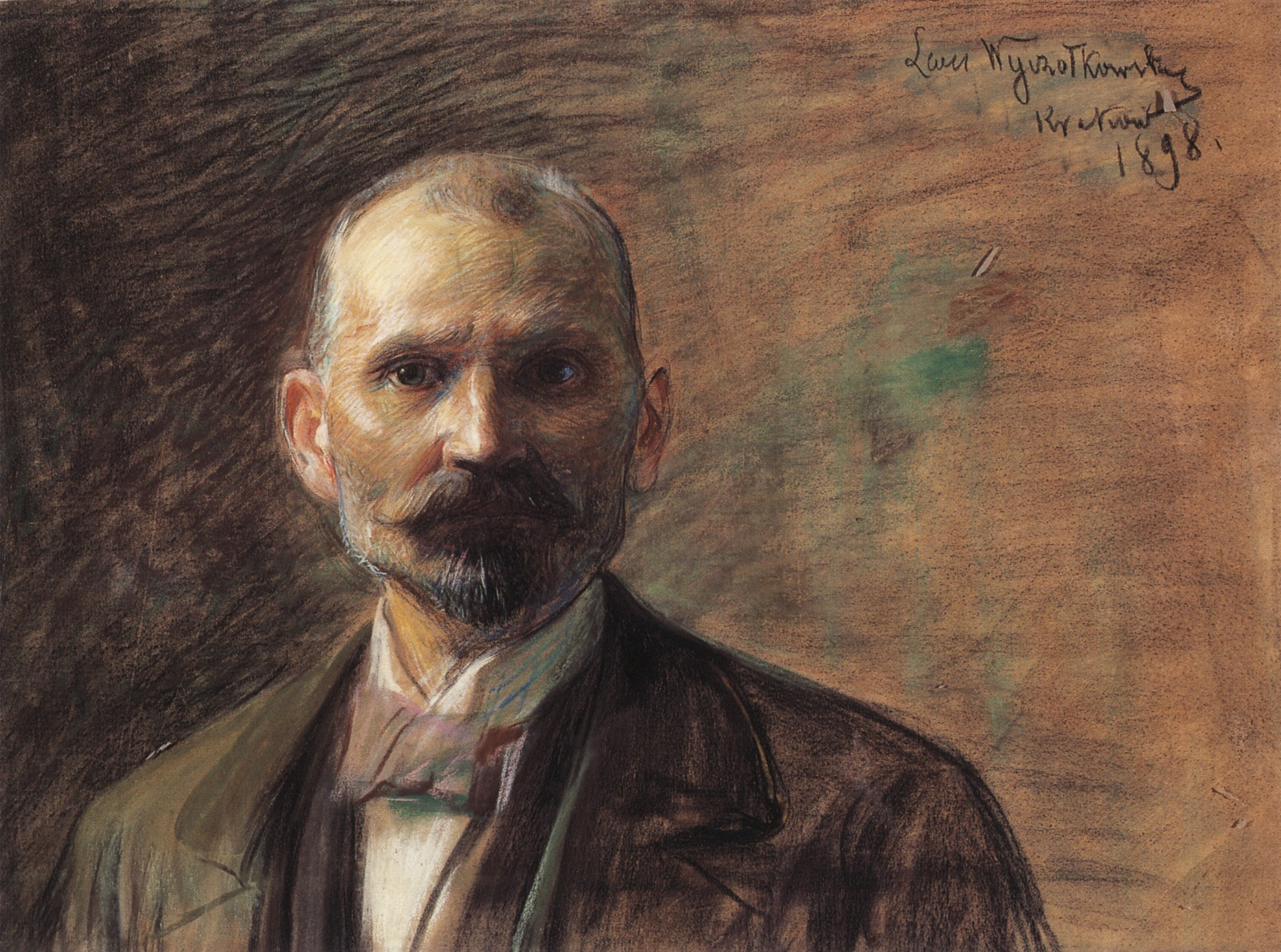
Wyczółkowski

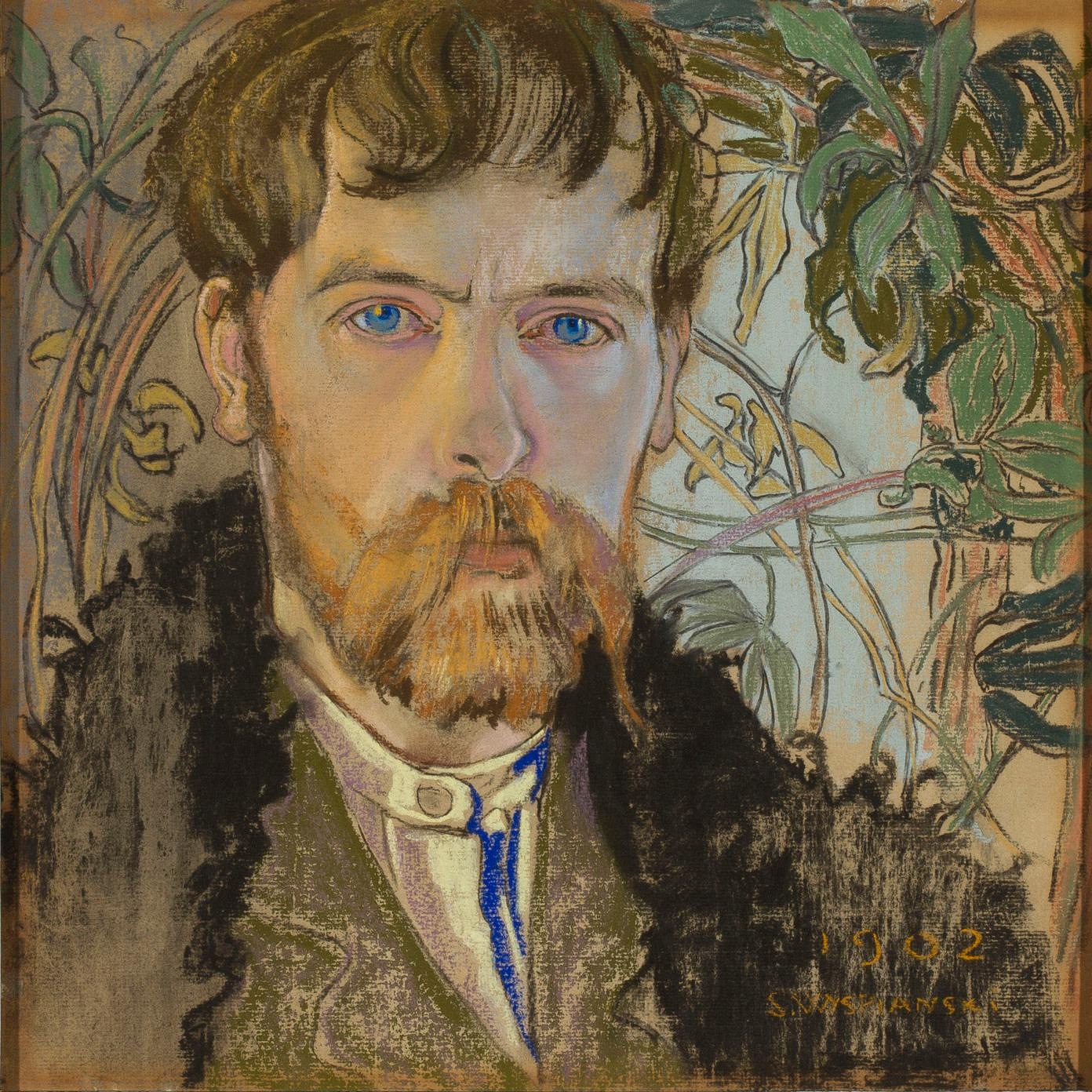
Wyspiański

== Entertainment ==
- Piotr Andrejew (1947–2017), film director
- Józef Arkusz, film director
- Tomasz Bagiński, creator of short animated films, BAFTA Award winner, Academy Award nominee
- Andrzej Bartkowiak, cinematographer, director, actor
- Eugeniusz Bodo, singer and actor
- Wojciech Bogusławski, actor, theater director, playwright; "father of the Polish Theater"
- Walerian Borowczyk, film director
- Ewa Braun, Academy Award-winning set decorator, costume designer, production designer
- Ewa Demarczyk, actress, poetry singer
- Doda (Dorota Rabczewska), actress, singer
- Paweł Edelman, cinematographer, European Film Award winner
- Aleksander Ford, director
- Piotr Fronczewski, actor and singer
- Aleksandra Gajewska, theatre director, actress, writer, politician
- Abelard Giza, comedian, filmmaker, actor, writer
- Jerzy Grotowski, theatre reformer
- Loda Halama, dancer, actor
- Adam Hanuszkiewicz, actor, theater director
- Wojciech Has, film director
- Marian Hemar, songwriter, cabaret artist
- Jerzy Hoffman, film director
- Agnieszka Holland, film director, nominated for Academy Awards and BAFTA Award
- Miłosz Horodyski, film and television director
- Sławomir Idziak, cinematographer, nominated for Oscar
- Stanislas Idzikowski, ballet dancer, choreographer and teacher
- Aleksander Ihnatowicz, actor, programmer
- Stefan Jaracz, actor, theater producer
- Jan A.P. Kaczmarek, Academy Award-winning composer, nominated to BAFTA Award
- Jacek Kaczmarski, protest songwriter, poetry singer, guitarist
- Janusz Kamiński, two-time-Oscars- and BAFTA Award-winning cinematographer and film director
- Bronislau Kaper, Academy Award-winning composer
- Krzysztof Kieślowski, film director, nominated for Academy Awards
- Anna Kochanowska, radio journalist and politician
- Max Kolonko, Polish-American TV personality, producer, writer
- Joanna Krupa, actress and supermodel
- Kazimierz Kutz, film director
- Irena Kwiatkowska (1912–2011), actress
- Pola Negri, film actress, singer
- Vaslav Nijinsky (Wacław Niżyński), ballet dancer considered the greatest male lead of the early 20th century
- Hanka Ordonówna (1902–1950), singer, dancer, actress
- Jerzy Owsiak, broadcaster
- Krzysztof Pastor, dancer, choreographer and ballet director
- Paweł Pawlikowski, film director
- Marianna Franciszka Pierożyńska (1763–1816), actress, opera singer
- Jan Pietrzak (born 1937), satirist, cabaret performer
- Roman Polanski, award-winning film director raised and educated in Poland
- Beata Pozniak, Polish-American actress, director, activist, writer, producer
- Jeremi Przybora, writer, actor and singer
- Krzysztof Ptak, cinematographer
- Marie Rambert, influential ballet pedagogue and director
- Zbigniew Rybczyński, Oscar- and Emmy Award-winning filmmaker
- Lew Rywin, film producer
- Andrzej Saramonowicz, screenwriter, film director
- Olga Sawicka, ballet dancer and choreographer
- Leon Schiller, theatre director
- Izabella Scorupco, Polish-born Hollywood-actress and singer
- Jerzy Skolimowski, film director
- Przemysław Skwirczyński, cinematographer
- Piotr Sobocinski, cinematographer
- Allan Starski, Oscar-winning production designer, art director, set designer
- Yvonne Strahovski (Strzechowski), Polish-Australian television, film, and voice actress
- Jerzy Stuhr, actor, film director
- Aleksandra Szwed, actress, television presenter, singer
- Franciszka Themerson, filmmaker and artist
- Henryk Tomaszewski, mime
- Basia Trzetrzelewska, singer
- Anna Tsuchiya, Japanese singer, actress, model of Polish descent
- Andrzej Wajda, Academy Award, Golden Palm, BAFTA Award, Silver Berlin Bear, César Award and Golden Lion winning film director
- Harry Warner, American Warner Bros. co-founder
- Albert Warner, American Warner Bros. co-founder
- Sam Warner, American Warner Bros. co-founder
- Jerzy Wasowski, radio announcer, composer, pianist, actor and director
- Michał Waszyński, film director
- Leon Woizikovsky, dancer and ballet master
- Dariusz Wolski, cinematographer
- Krzysztof Zanussi, film director
- Zbigniew Zapasiewicz, actor, theater director
- Adam Zdrójkowski, actor, television presenter
- Benjamin Zemach (1901–1997), choreographer and dancer, nominated for an Academy Award
- Andrzej Żuławski (1940–2016), film director
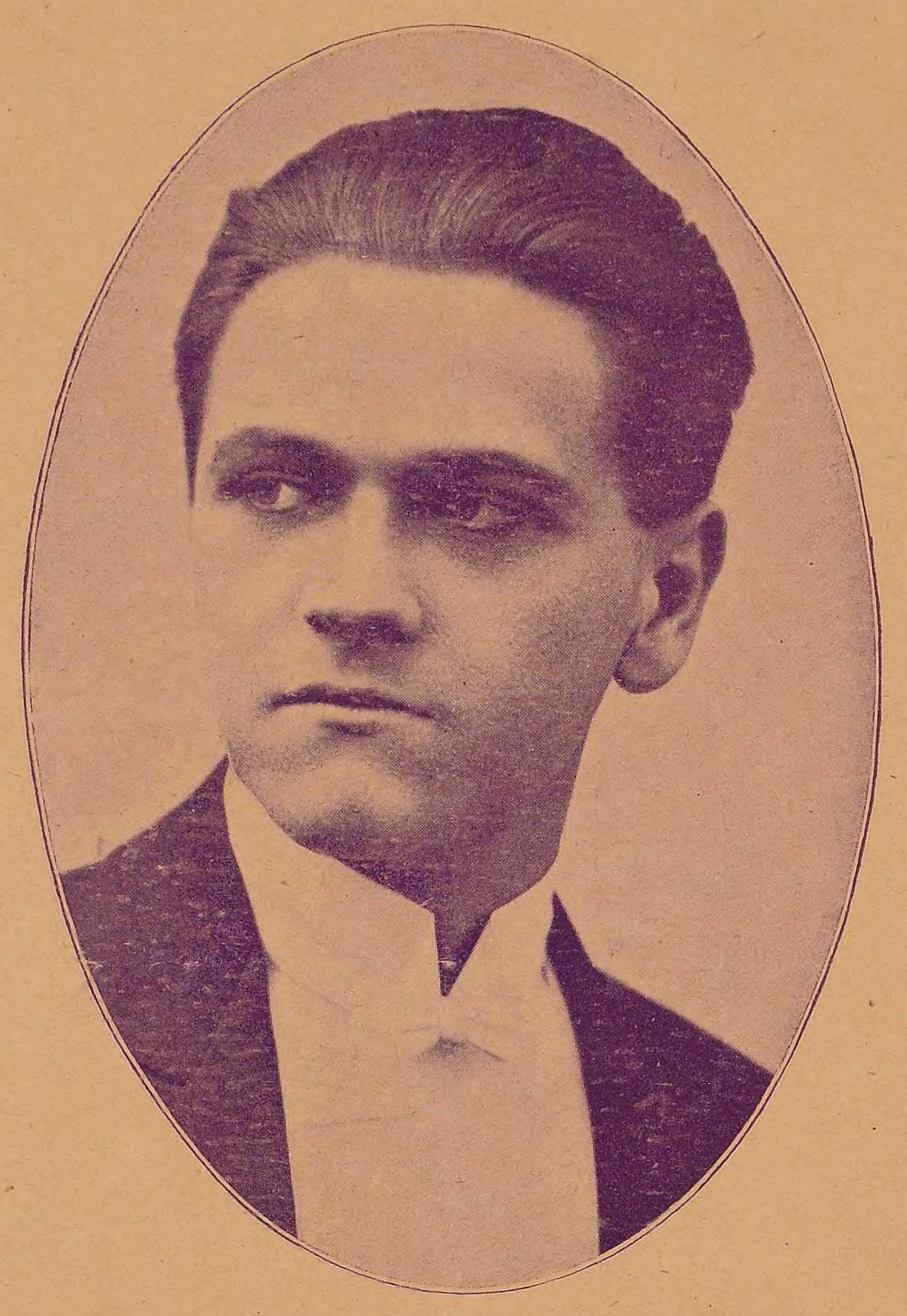
Bodo

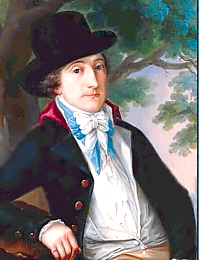
Bogusławski

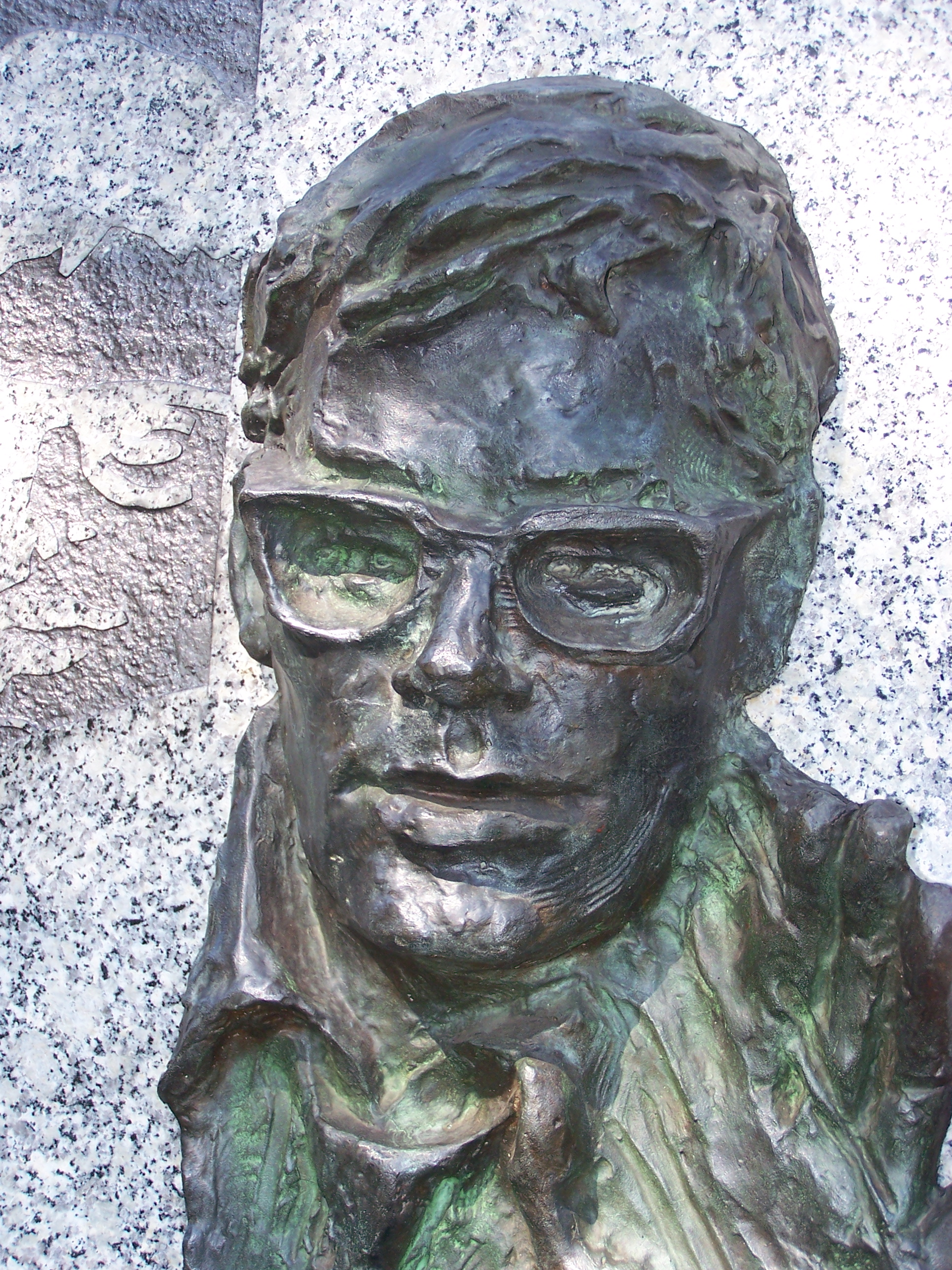
Cybulski

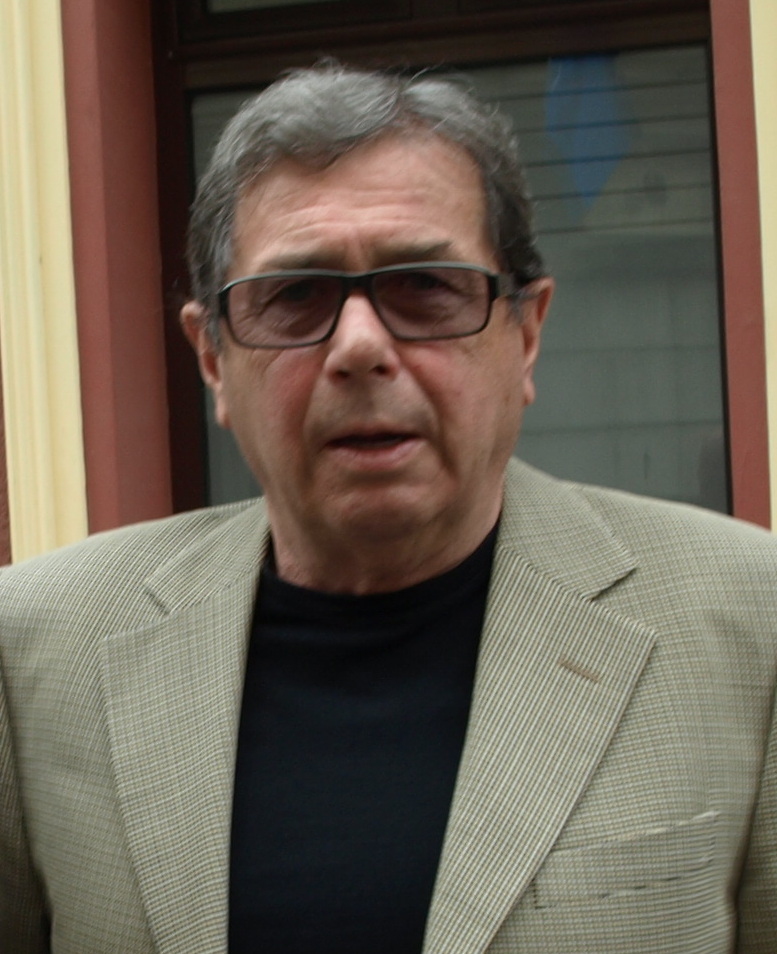
Gajos

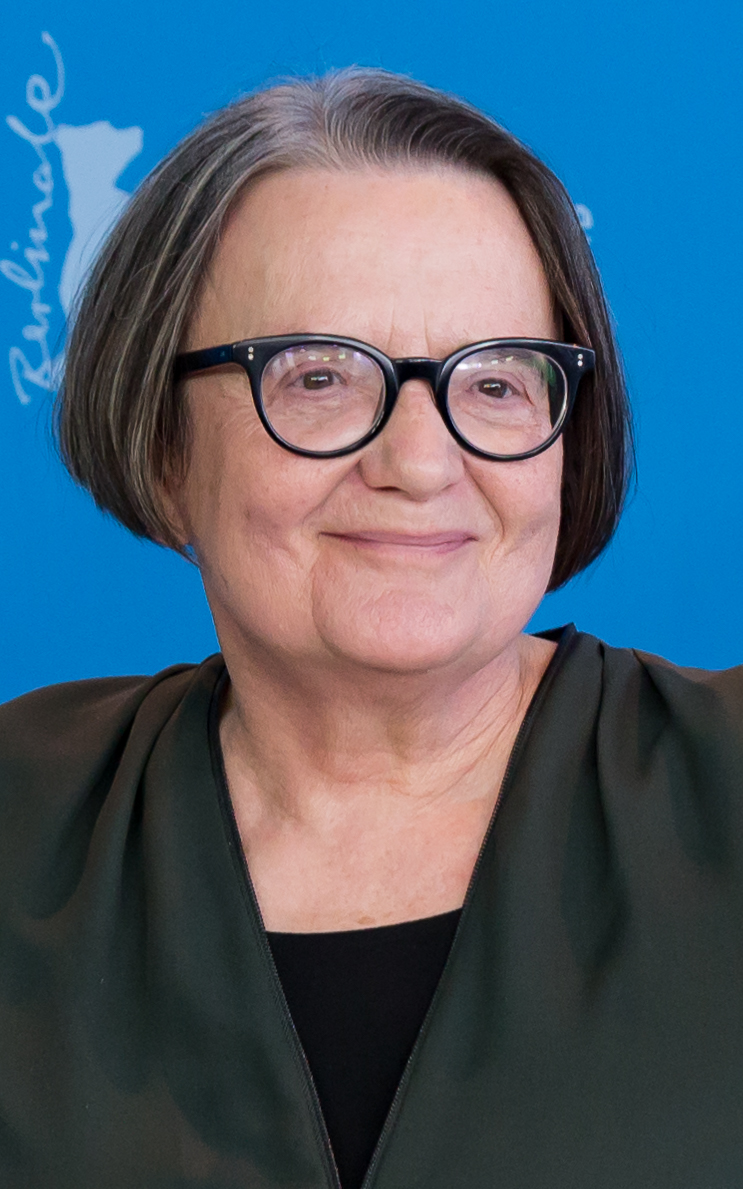
Holland

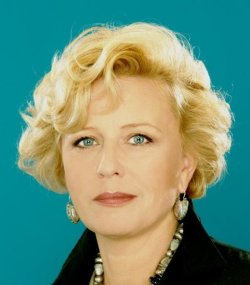
Janda

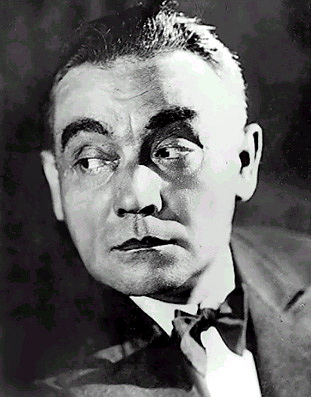
Jaracz

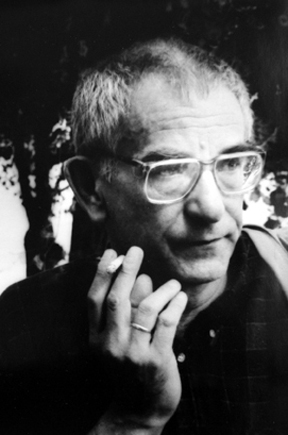
Kieślowski

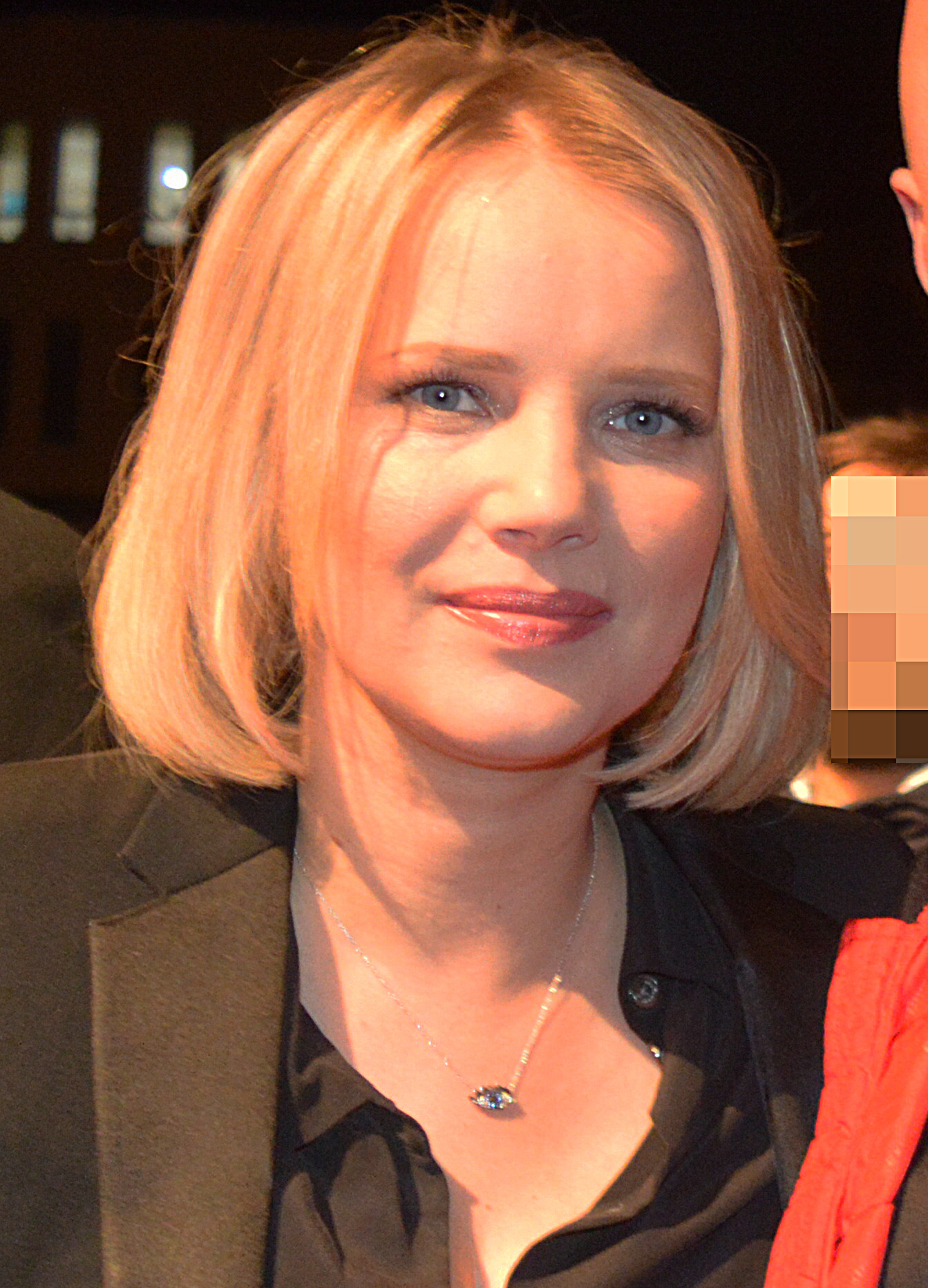
Kulig

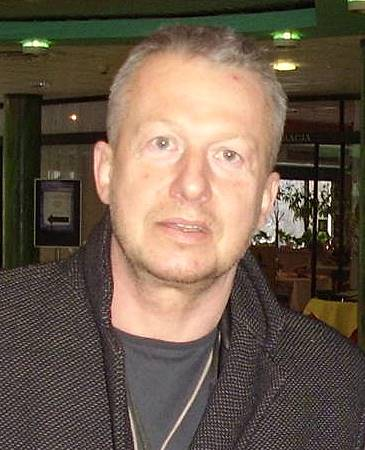
Linda

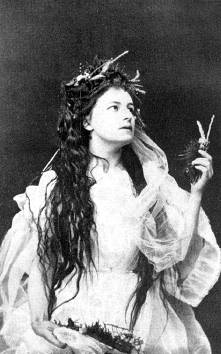
Modjeska

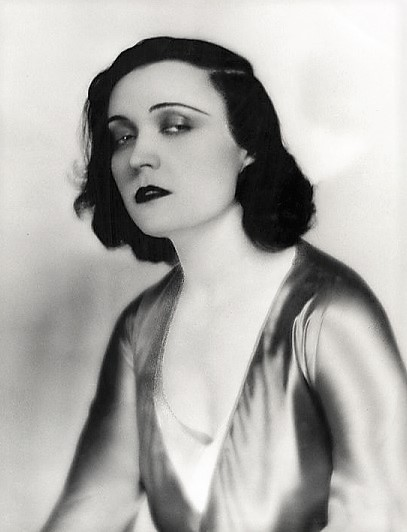
Negri

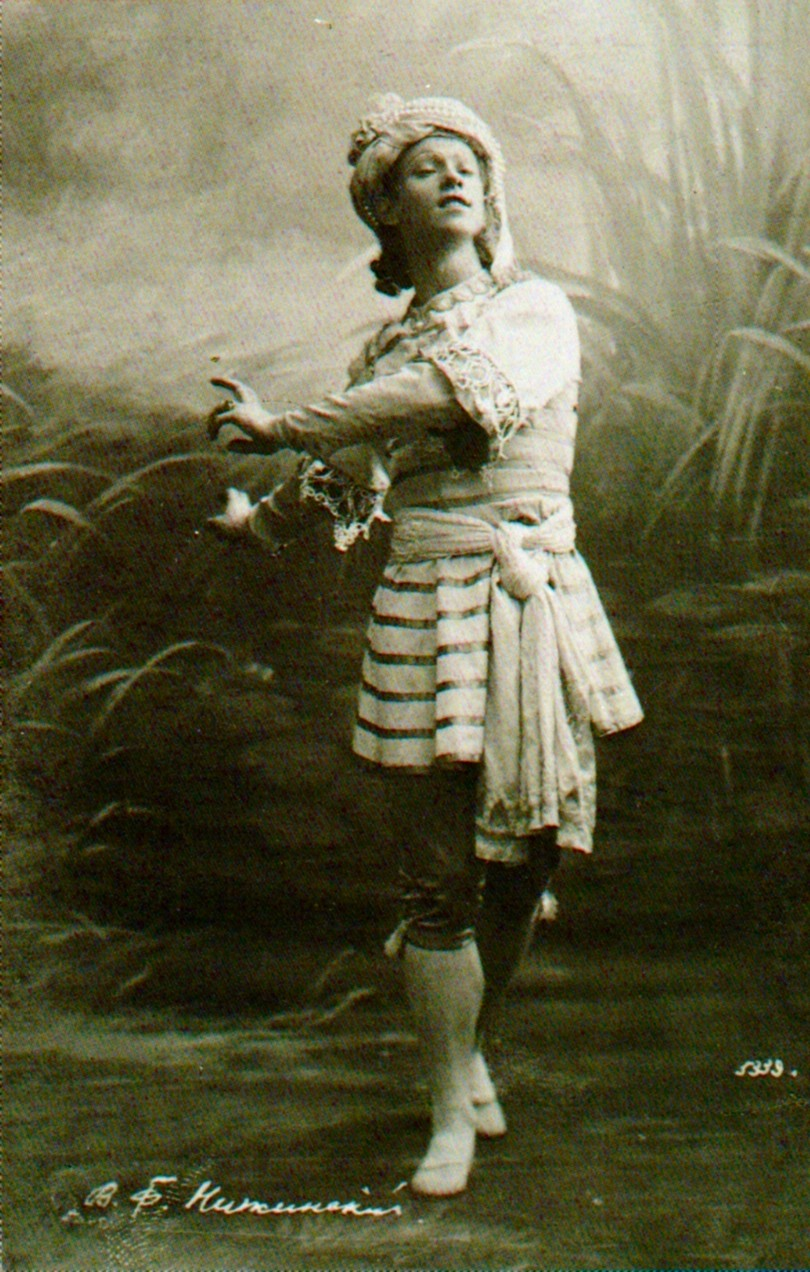
Nijinsky

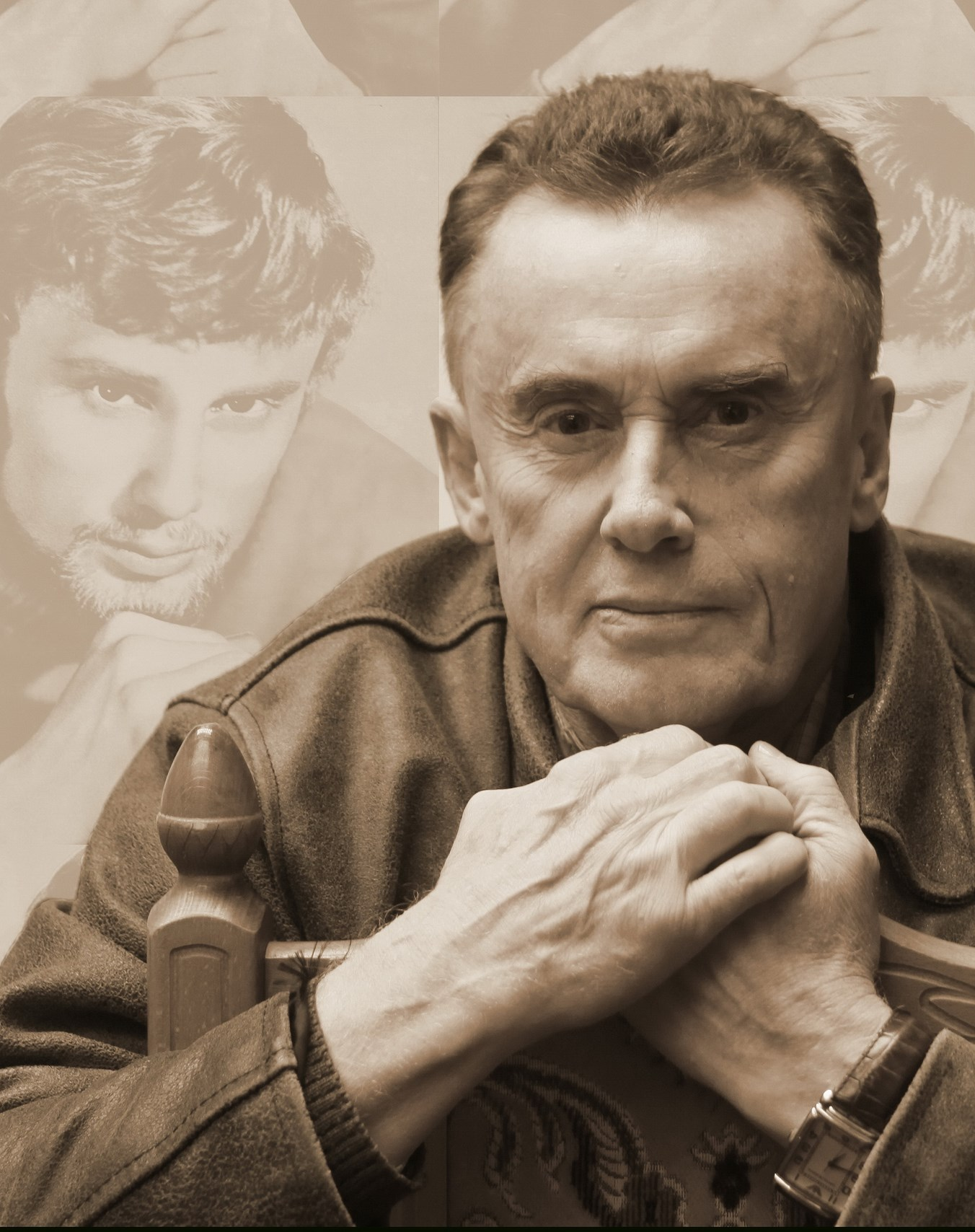
Olbrychski

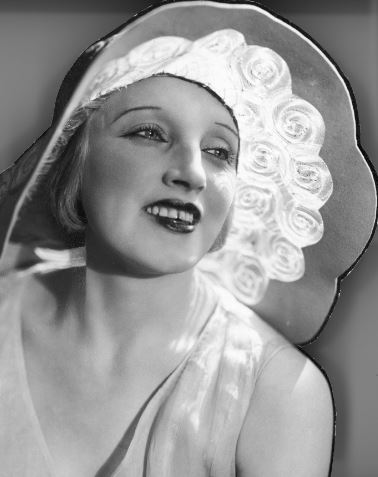
Ordonówna

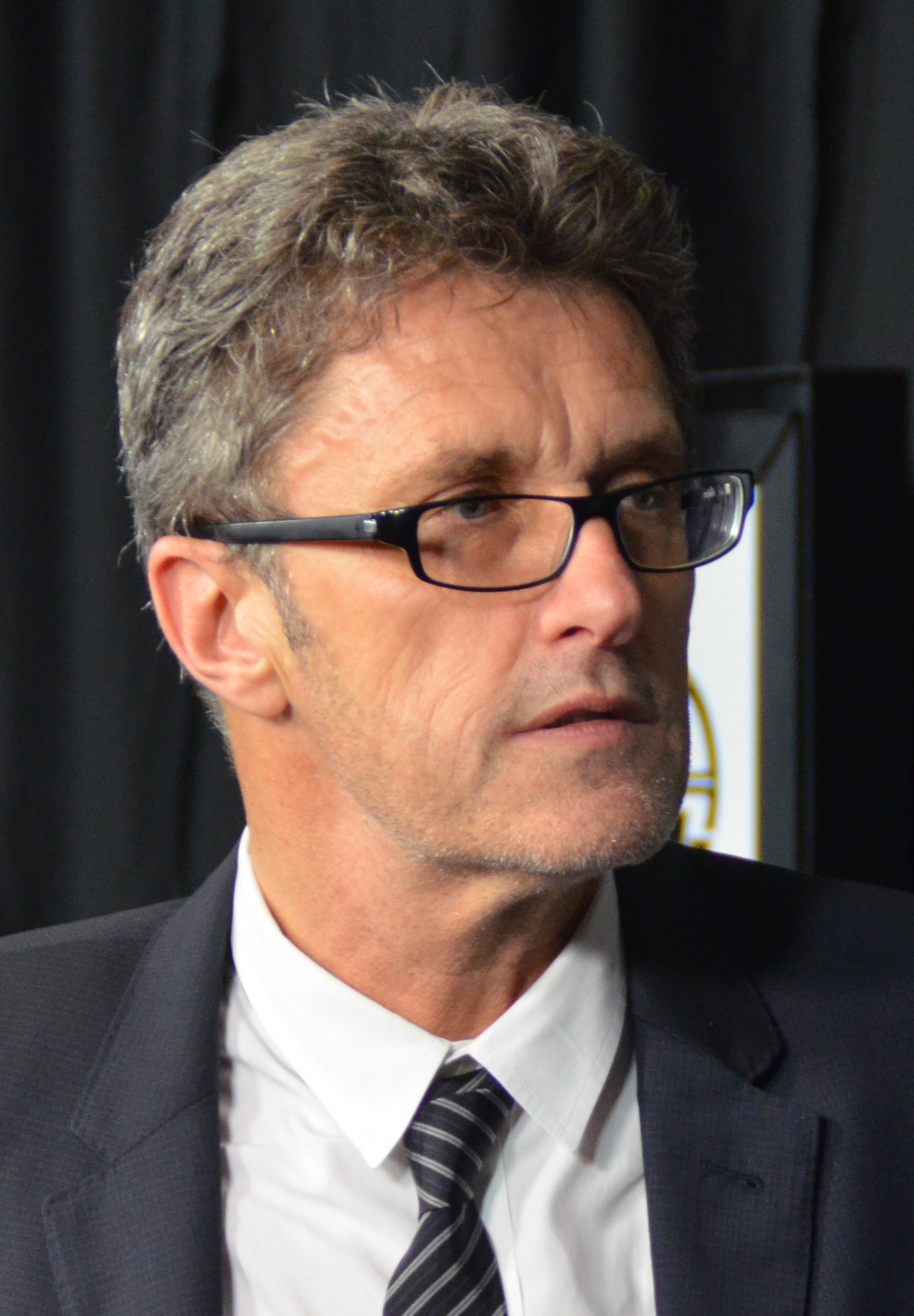
Pawlikowski

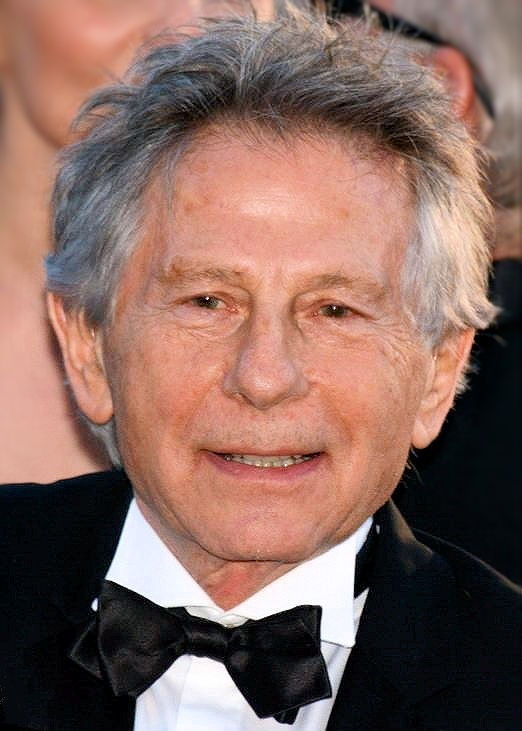
Polanski

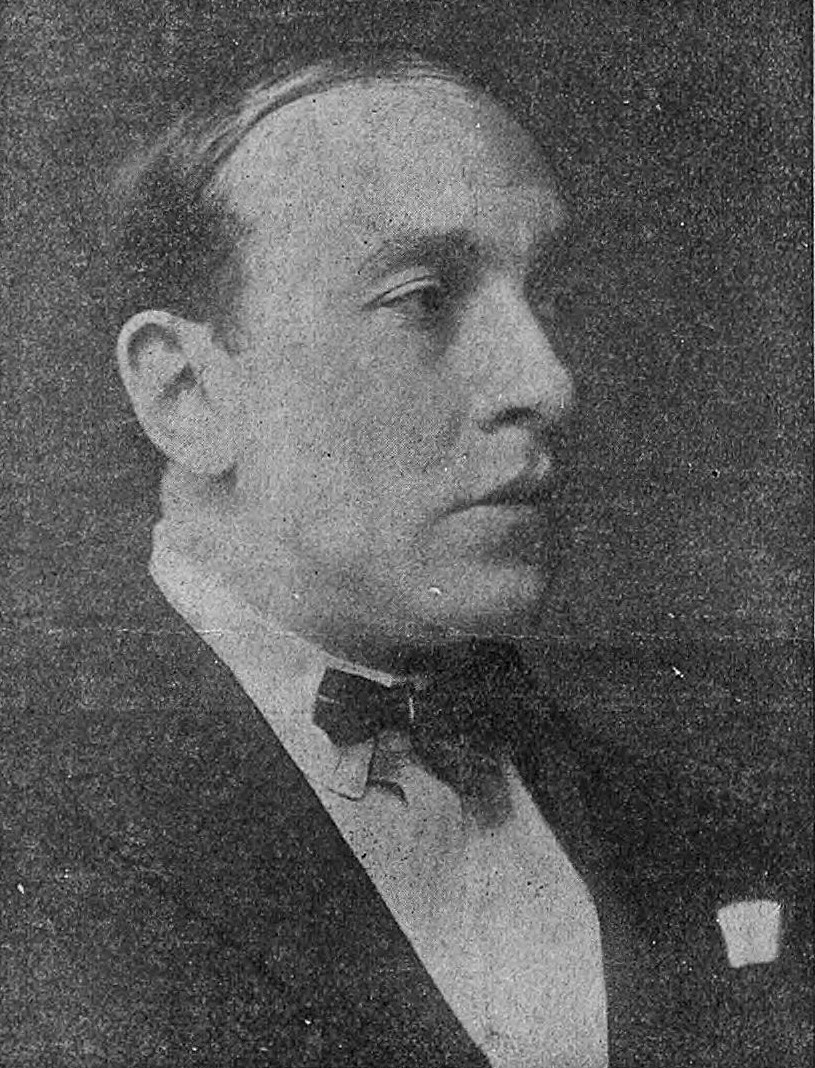
Schiller

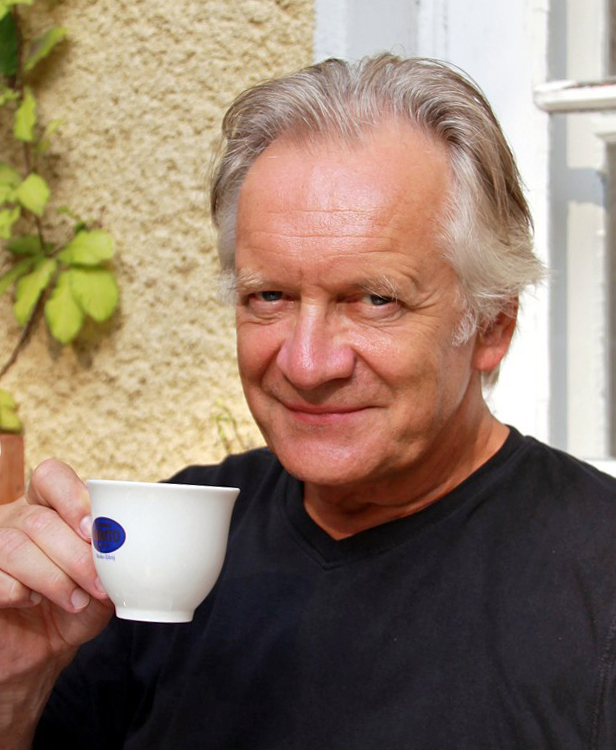
Seweryn

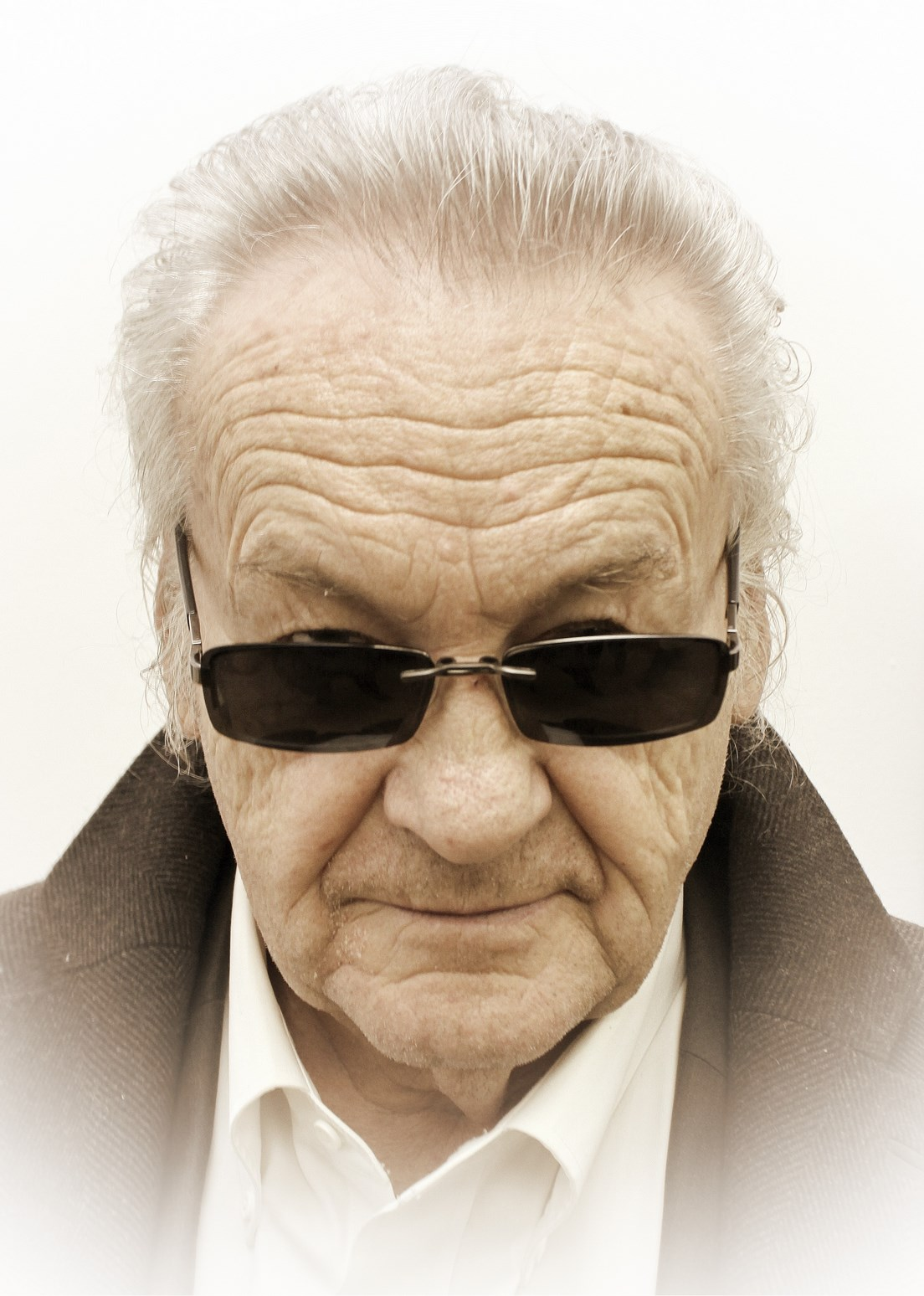
Skolimowski

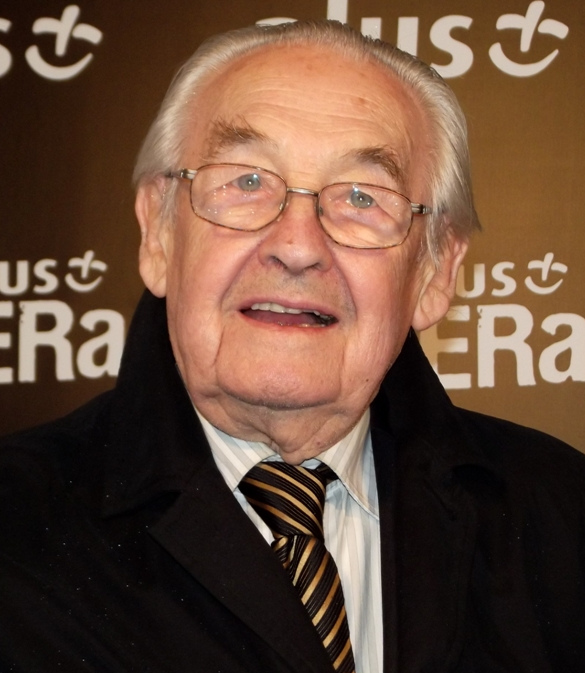
Wajda

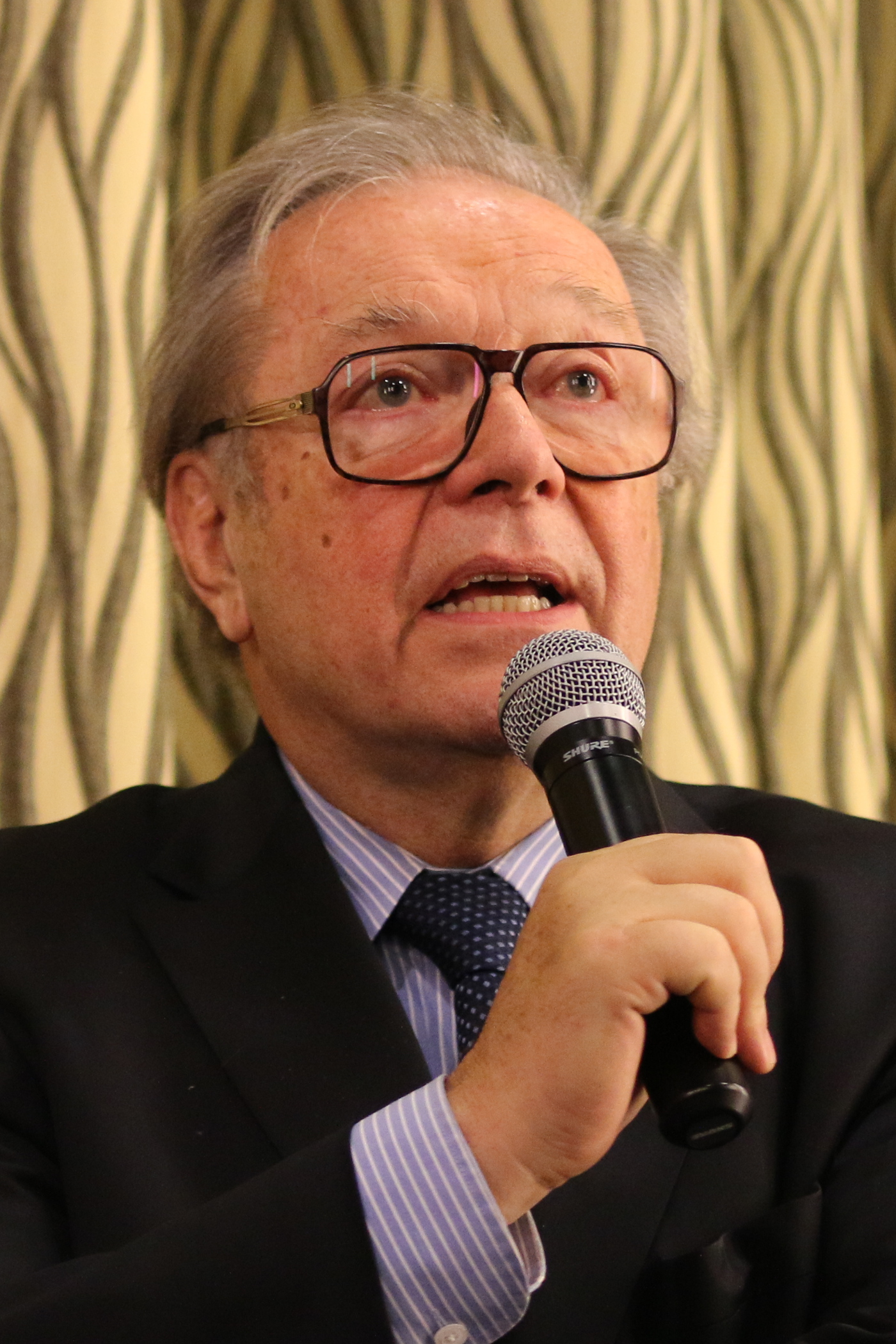
Zanussi

== Business ==
- Jan Gotlib Bloch, railway financier who in 1898 predicted the railroad-moblized industrial warfare of World War I
- Count Xavier Branicki, financier, philanthropist, co-founder of Credit Foncier de France
- Rafał Brzoska, entrepreneur, investor and philanthropist, founder and CEO of InPost
- Hipolit Cegielski, businessman and social and cultural activist
- Andrzej Ciechanowiecki, Polish-British Antiquarian, gallery owner, collector and philanthropist
- André Citroën, French automotive industrialist
- Jack Cohen, English co-founder of the Tesco retail chain
- Franciszek Czapek, co-partner in Patek, Czapek & Co.
- Leszek Czarnecki, businessman
- Irena Eris, businesswoman
- Max Factor, Sr., Polish-American cosmetics entrepreneur
- Françoise Frenkel, bookshop entrepreneur
- Aleksandra Gajewska, politician and businessperson
- Henryk Grohman, textile manufacturer and patron of the arts
- Nathan Handwerker
- Anna Jabłonowska, early social and industrial entrepreneur, magnate
- Karol Jaroszyński, entrepreneur, financier and philanthropist
- Barbara Piasecka Johnson, humanitarian, philanthropist, widow of J. Seward Johnson, Sr.
- Leopold Stanisław Kronenberg, banker
- Stanisław Kronenberg, financier
- Jerzy Franciszek Kulczycki, merchant, spy, opened first Coffeehouse in Vienna (1683)
- Dominika Kulczyk, businesswoman
- Grażyna Kulczyk, businesswoman, philanthropist, art collector
- Jan Kulczyk, CEO of Kulczyk Investments, richest 21st-century Pole
- Sebastian Kulczyk, businessman
- Michał Łempicki, mining engineer, entrepreneur, deputy of the State Duma of the Russian Empire
- Henry Lowenfeld, Polish-born British theatrical impresario and brewing entrepreneur
- Tomasz Lubienski, early industrialist co-founder, with his brothers, of Zyrardow textile industry
- Henryk Łubieński, banker, lawyer, industrial pioneer and Russian exile (1848)
- Zofia Lubomirska, textile entrepreneur in Przeworsk
- Michael Marks, co-founder of Marks and Spencer retail chain
- Aleksander Meysztowicz, politician, landowner, activist, chairperson of Vilnius Land Bank
- Dariusz Miłek, businessman and entrepreneur, founder of CCC SA.
- Henryk Orfinger, cosmetics entrepreneur
- Samuel Orgelbrand, editor
- Antoni Patek, co-founder of watchmakers Patek Philippe & Co.
- Antoni Protazy Potocki, banker and industrialist who developed Odesa into an international port (1780s)
- Izrael Poznański, textile magnate, philanthropist
- Helena Rubinstein, Polish-American cosmetics entrepreneur, one of the richest women who ever lived
- Frank Russek (1875/1876-1948), Polish-born American co-founder of the Russeks department store chain
- Karol Scheibler, German-born Polish textile magnate
- Feliks Sobański, landowner and philanthropist
- Zygmunt Solorz-Żak, businessman and media tycoon, owner of Polsat and Plus
- Michał Sołowow, businessman and rally driver
- Piotr Steinkeller, German-Polish industrial pioneer, King of Zinc
- Henri Strzelecki, founder of Henri Lloyd, Ltd., sportswear manufacturer
- Piotr Szulczewski, Canadian-Polish businessman and computer scientist, co-founder of e-commerce platform Wish.com
- Stefan Tyszkiewicz, founder of Stetysz early Polish car manufacturer
- Hyppolite Wawelberg, Polish-Jewish banker and philanthropist
- Karol Wedel, Chocolatier, confectioner
- Antoni Weynerowski, founder in Bydgoszcz of the firm Leo, renamed Kobra
- Louis Wolowski, financier co-founder of Credit Foncier de France
- Andrzej Artur Zamoyski, initiated river transportation
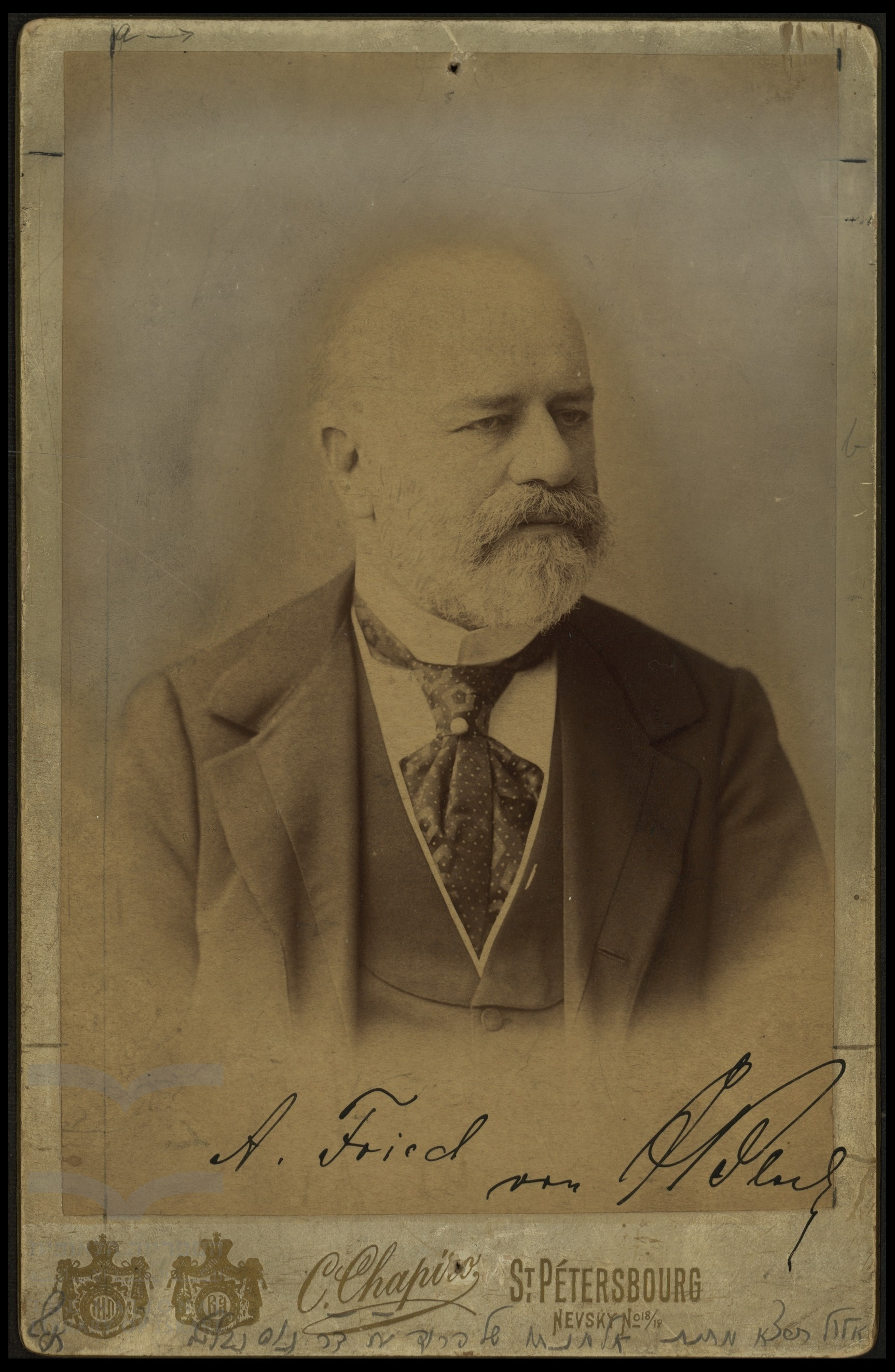
Bloch

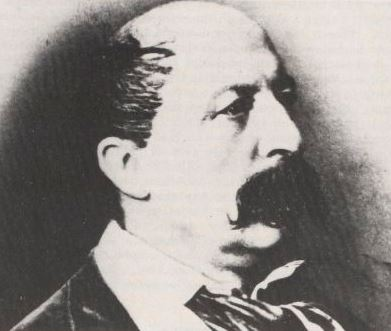
Branicki

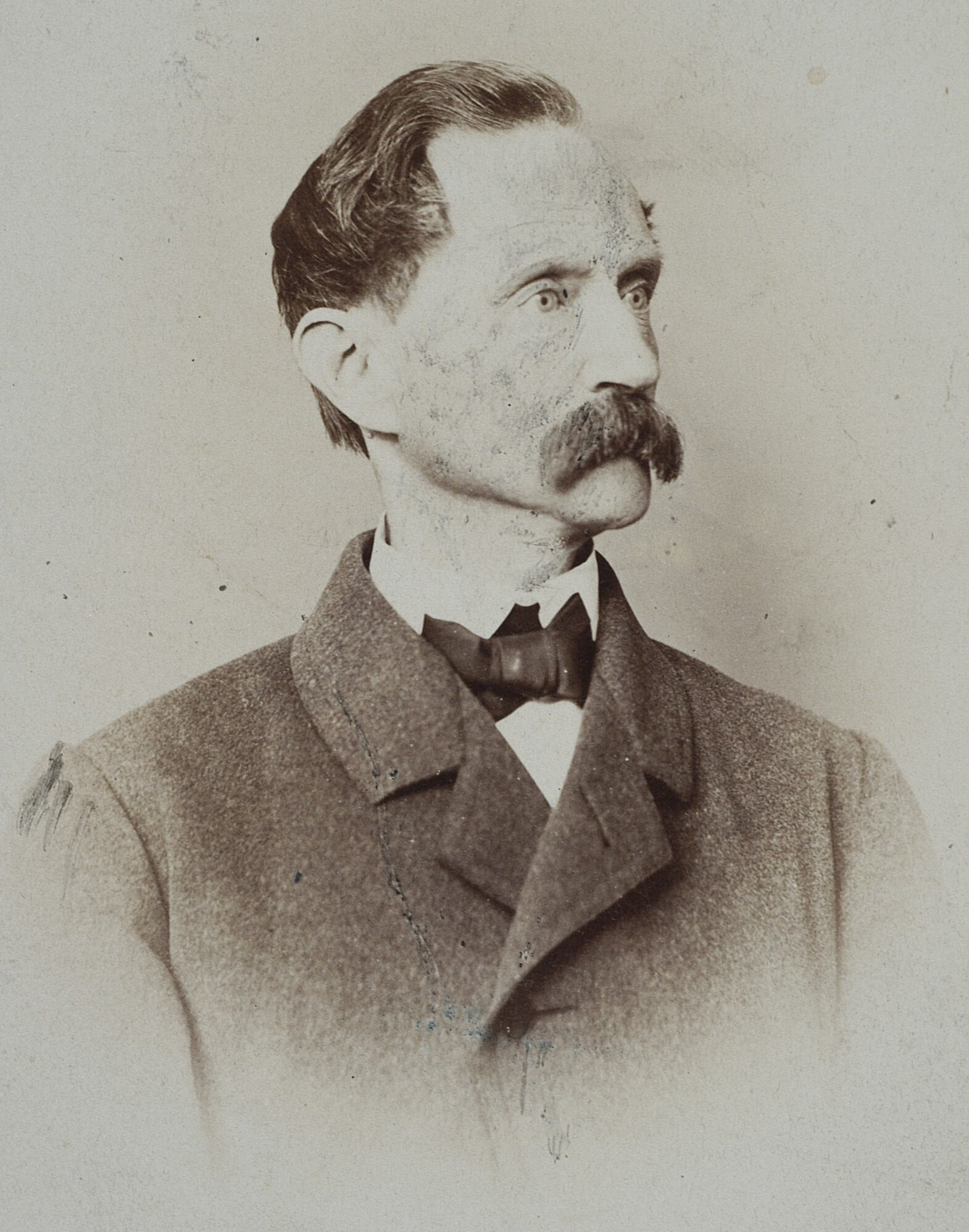
Cegielski

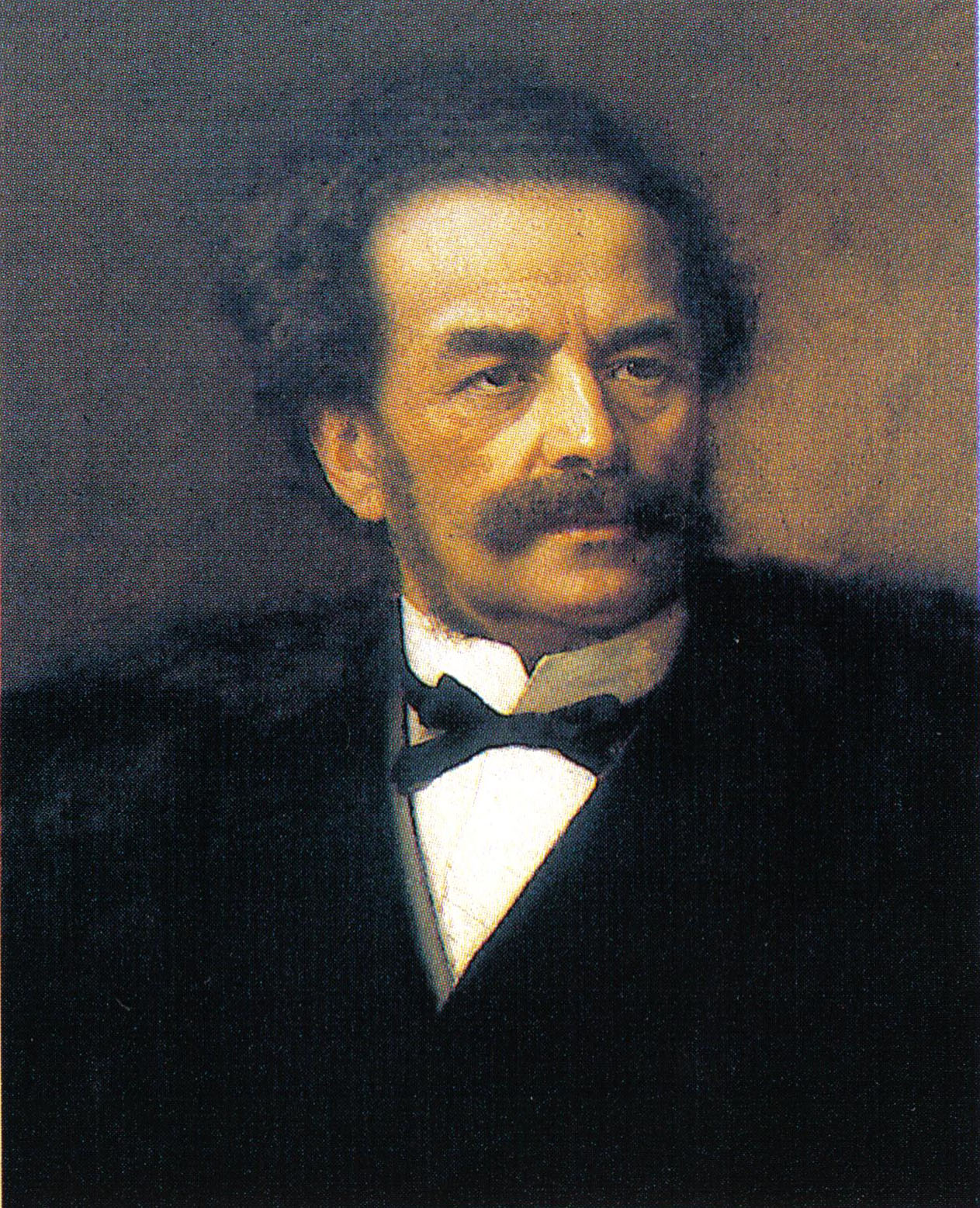
L. Kronenberg

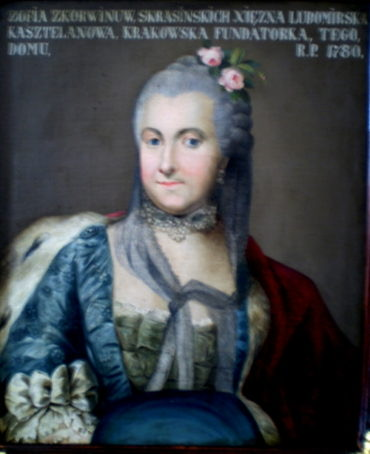
Lubomirska

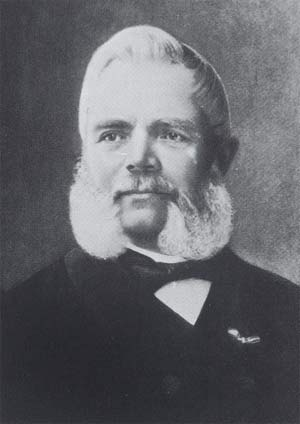
Patek

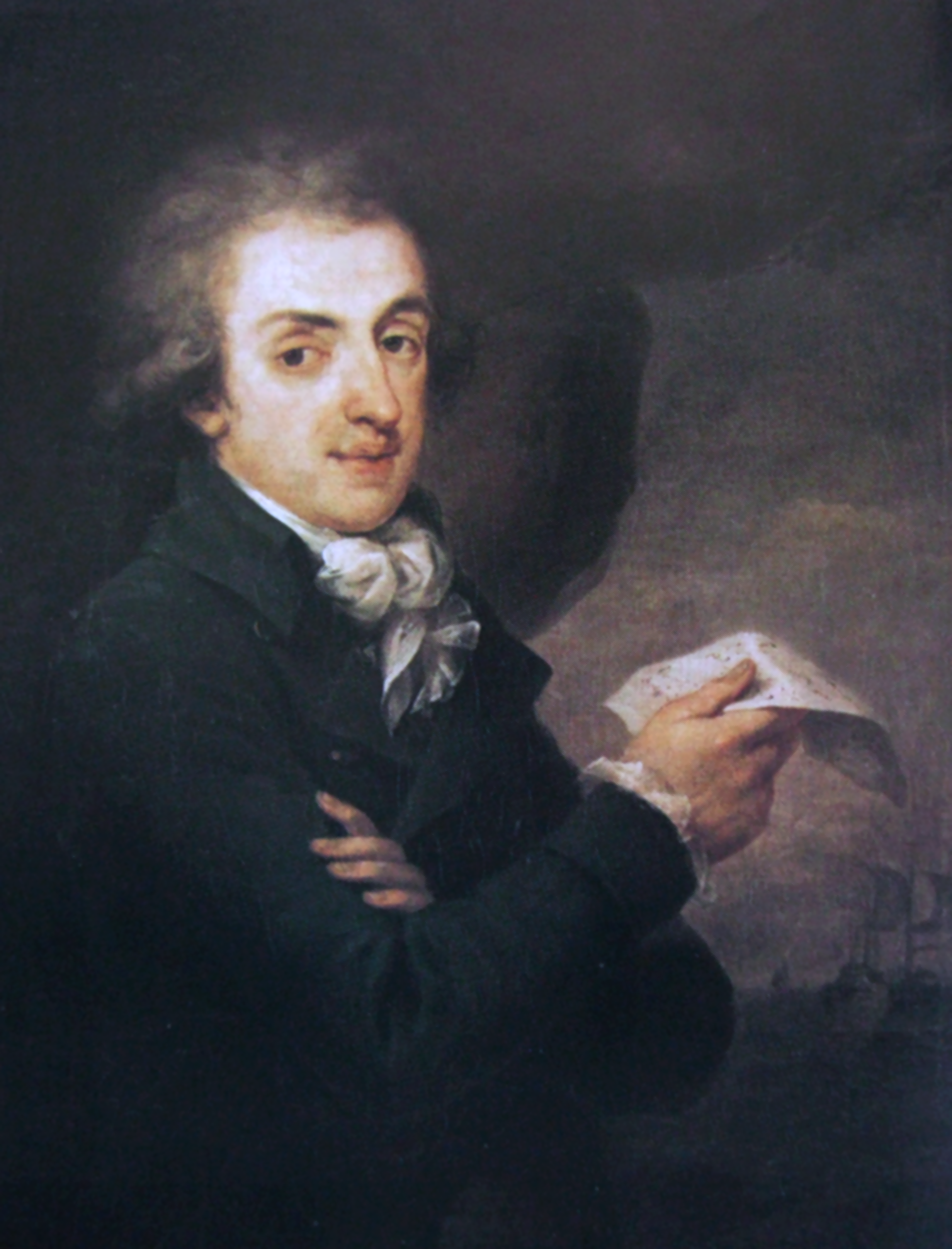
Potocki

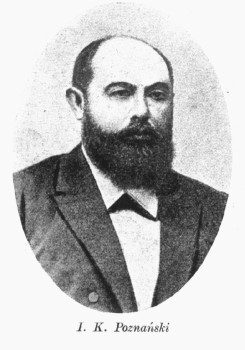
Poznański

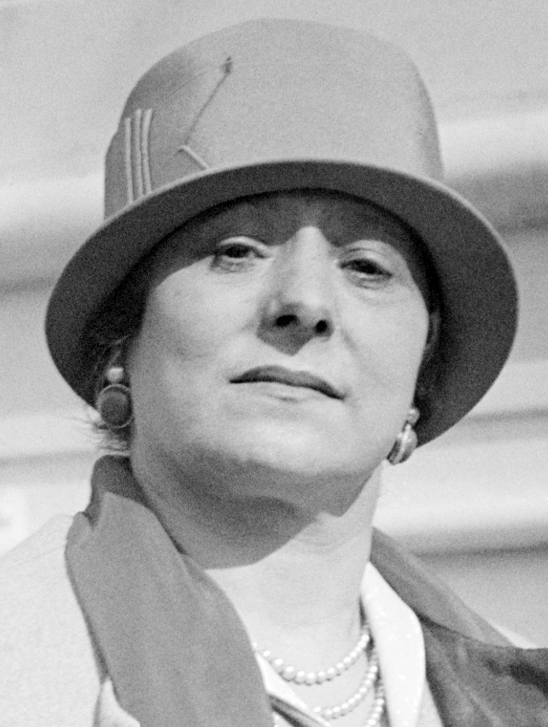
Rubinstein

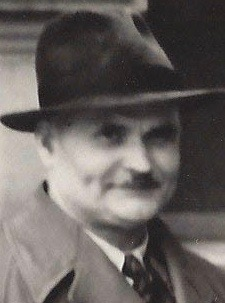
Tyszkiewicz

== Politics ==
- Tomasz Arciszewski (1877–1955), first Prime Minister of Poland in exile (1944–47)
- Kazimierz Feliks Badeni (1846–1909), count, Minister-President of Austria (1895–97)
- Menachem Begin (1913–1992), founder of both Herut and Likud, sixth Prime Minister of Israel
- David Ben-Gurion (born David Grün; 1886–1973), head of the Jewish Agency, first Prime Minister of Israel
- Marek Belka (born 1952), director of economic policy in the interim coalition administration of Iraq, Prime Minister of Poland (2004–05)
- Bolesław Bierut (1892–1956), leader of communist Poland (1948–56)
- Michał Bobrzyński (1849–1935), Governor of Galicia (1908–13)
- Anna Borucka-Cieślewicz (born 1941), elected to the Sejm in 2005
- Zbigniew Brzeziński (1928–2017), Polish-American political scientist, advisor to US President Jimmy Carter
- Matheus Butrymowicz (1745–1814), liberal member of the Great Sejm assembled in Warsaw (1788–92)
- Jerzy Buzek (born 1940), Prime Minister of Poland (1997–2001), President of the European Parliament (2009–12)
- Jan Ciechanowski (1887–1973), Ambassador to the United States
- Alexandre Colonna-Walewski (1810–1868), Polish and French politician and diplomat; French Foreign Minister under Napoleon III.
- Józef Cyrankiewicz (1911–1989), Prime Minister of communistic Poland (1947–52 and 1954–70)
- Adam Jerzy Czartoryski (1770–1861), prince, statesman, Prime Minister (1830–31)
- Ignacy Daszyński (1866–1936), prime minister of the Provisional People's Government of the Republic of Poland (1918)
- Jan Dekert (1738–1790), merchant, mayor of Warsaw (1789–90)
- Isaac Deutscher (1907–1967), writer, journalist, political activist
- Heinrich Dietz (1840–1901), member of the Prussian parliament, philanthropist
- Roman Dmowski (1864–1939), nationalist politician, statesman
- Andrzej Duda (born 1972), sixth President of the Third Polish Republic (2015–2025)
- Felix Dzerzhynsky (1877–1926), founder of Soviet State Security under the original name Cheka
- Alvin Gajadhur, politician, statesman, chemical engineer, and educator, the Minister of Infrastructure in 2023, the Chief Inspector of Road Transport from 2017 to 2024
- Aleksandra Gajewska (born 1971), theatre director, writer, stage actress, and politician, member of the Silesian Voivodeship Sejmik (2007–2013)
- Aleksandra Gajewska (born 1989), politician and businessperson, member of the Sejm (since 2019), the secretary of state of the Ministry of Family, Labour and Social Policy (since 2023), member of the Warsaw City Council (2014–2019)
- Edward Gierek (1913–2001), leader of communist Poland (1970–80)
- Maciej Golubiewski (born 1976), political scientist and diplomat
- Władysław Gomułka (1905–1982), leader of communist Poland (1956–70)
- Ludwik Gorzkowski (1811–1857), politician and revolutionary activist
- Julian Gutowski (1823–1890), Mayor of Nowy Sącz (1867–70)
- Piotr Jaroszewicz (1909–1992), Prime Minister of communist Poland (1970–80)
- Wojciech Jaruzelski (1923–2014), last leader of communist Poland (1981–89), first President of the Third Polish Republic (1989–90)
- Wojciech Jastrzębowski (1799–1882) was a polymath who in 1831, after fighting in Poland's November 1830 Uprising, drafted the first constitution for his proposed European union.
- Ryszard Kaczorowski (1919–2010), sixth and last President of Poland in exile (1989–90)
- Jarosław Kaczyński (born 1949), identical twin brother of Lech, leader of Law and Justice party, Prime Minister of Poland (2006–07)
- Lech Kaczyński (1949–2010), fourth President (2005–10) of Third Polish Republic, died in Smolensk air crash
- Agnieszka Kłopotek (born 1969), member of the Sejm (since 2023)
- Hugo Kołłątaj (1750–1812), co-author of Constitution of 3 May 1791
- Bronisław Komorowski (born 1952), fifth President of the Third Polish Republic (2010–15)
- Wojciech Korfanty (1873–1939), leader of Silesians during the Third Silesian uprising
- Janusz Korwin-Mikke (born 1942), far-right politician, former member of the Sejm
- Aleksandra Kosiorek (born 1985), politician, jurist, mayor of Gdynia (since 2024)
- Stanisław Kot (1885–1975), historian, politician, diplomat
- Leon Kozłowski (1892–1944), archeologist; Prime Minister of Poland (1934–35).
- Adrian Kubicki (born 1987), Consul General of the Republic of Poland in New York City
- Jan Kucharzewski (1876–1952), first Prime Minister of Kingdom of Poland (1917–18)
- Jacek Kuroń (1934–2004), politician, social activist
- Anna Kurska (1929–2016), judge, lawyer, and member of the Polish Senate
- Aleksander Kwaśniewski (born 1954), third President of the Third Polish Republic (1995–2005)
- Aleksandra Leo (born 1981), Polish politician and lawyer, member of the Sejm (since 2023)
- Andrzej Lepper (1954–2011), leader of Samoobrona and Deputy Prime Minister
- Herman Lieberman (1870–1941), lawyer and prominent Socialist politician
- Feliks Lubienski (1758–1848), Minister of Justice, introduced the Code Napoleon, state archives, and public libraries
- Katarzyna Lubnauer (born 1969), leader of Modern political party
- Rosa Luxemburg (1871–1919), leading Marxist theoretician
- Teofil Magdziński (1818–1889), political activist in Bydgoszcz, representative at the Reichstag
- Julian Marchlewski (1866–1925), Soviet politician
- Kazimierz Marcinkiewicz (born 1959), Prime Minister of Poland (2005–06)
- Tadeusz Mazowiecki (1927–2013), politician, first Prime Minister of the Third Polish Republic (Poland)
- Aleksander Meysztowicz (1864–1943), politician, landowner, social activist, Ministry of Justice of Poland (1926–1928), chairperson of the Provisional Governing Commission of the Republic of Central Lithuania (1921–1922), Minister of Internal Affairs of Central Lithuania (1921–1922), member of the State Council of the Russian Empire (1909–1917)
- Adam Michnik (born 1946), influential journalist
- Ludwik Mierosławski (1814–1878), insurgent, general, Paris communard
- Stanisław Mieroszewski (1827–1900), member of the Imperial Council of Austria
- Stanisław Mikołajczyk (1901–1966), Prime Minister of Poland (1943–44), Agrarian Party politician
- Karol Modzelewski (1937–2019), activist, politician and academic
- Jędrzej Moraczewski (1870–1944), first Prime Minister of II RP (1918–19)
- Ignacy Mościcki (1867–1946), third President (1926–39) of the Second Polish Republic
- Walery Mroczkowski (1840–1889), anarchist, friend of Mikhail Bakunin
- Lewis Bernstein Namier (1888–1960), British politician and historian
- Gabriel Narutowicz (1865–1922), first President of the Second Polish Republic (1922)
- Karol Nawrocki (born 1983), seventh President of the Third Polish Republic (since 2025)
- Józef Oleksy, Prime Minister of III RP (1995–96), Speaker of the Sejm (1993–95; 2004–05)
- Janusz Onyszkiewicz (born 1937), Solidarność spokesman, mathematician, alpinist, Minister of Defence
- Marian P. Opala, Justice of the Oklahoma Supreme Court
- Stanisław Osiecki, Minister of Agriculture 1923, Minister of Trade & Industry (1925–26)
- Jozef Maksymilian Ossolinski (1748–1826), founder of Ossolineum, Poland's signal cultural patron
- Stanisław Ostrowski (1892–1982), third President of Poland in exile (1972–79)
- Ignacy Paderewski (1860–1941), second Prime Minister of the Second Polish Republic (1919)
- Longin Pastusiak (1935–2025), Marshal of the Senate (2001–05)
- Waldemar Pawlak (born 1959), Prime Minister of Poland (1992 and 1993–95)
- Karolina Pawliczak (born 1976), lawyer and politician
- Shimon Peres (born Szymon Perski; 1923–2016), President of Israel (2007–14), Prime Minister of Israel (1984–86; 1995–96)
- Teodoro Picado Michalski (1900–1960), Costa Rican president, Polish mother
- Józef Piłsudski (1867–1935), statesman, politician and Marshal of Poland
- Emilia Plater (1806–1831), revolutionary, independence leader
- Władysław Broel-Plater (1808–1889), independence activist, founder of Polish Museum, Rapperswil
- Alfred Józef Potocki (1817 or 1822–1889), count, Minister-President of Austria (1870–71)
- Ignacy Potocki (1750–1809), co-author of Constitution of 3 May 1791
- Adam Pragier (1886–1976), leading socialist deputy, exiled minister and writer
- Władysław Raczkiewicz (1885–1947), first President of Poland in exile (1939–47)
- Edward Raczyński (1891–1993), fourth President of Poland in exile (1979–86)
- Antoni Radziwiłł (1775–1833), prince, the Duke-Governor of Grand Duchy of Posen (Poznań) (1815–31)
- Józef Retinger (1888–1960), writer, adviser, grey eminence, founder of the Bilderberg conferences
- Adam Ronikier (1881–1952), count, president of the Central Welfare Council (1916–18; 1940–43)
- Adam Rudawski (born 1966), voivode of West Pomeranian Voivodeship (since 2023)
- Kazimierz Sabbat (1913–1989), fifth President of Poland in exile (1986–89)
- Jacek Saryusz-Wolski (born 1948), vice-president of European Parliament (2004–07)
- Władysław Sikorski (1881–1943), general, Prime Minister of Poland (1939–43)
- Radosław Sikorski (born 1963), politician and former foreign minister (2007–14)
- Walery Sławek (1879–1939), independence fighter and former prime minister
- Agata Sobczyk, voivode of Greater Poland Voivodeship (since 2023)
- Stefan Starzyński (1893–1939), President of Warsaw (1934–39)
- Władysław Studnicki (1867–1953), politician and publicist
- Romuald Szeremietiew (born 1945), independence activist and former Minister of National Defense
- Krzysztof Szczerski (born 1973), Ambassador to the UN
- Beata Szydło (born 1963), Prime Minister of Poland (2015–17)
- Theodore de Korwin Szymanowski (1846–1901), conceptualised an economic union for Europe in 1885
- Róża Thun (born 1954), anticommunist activist, activist for European Union
- Donald Tusk (born 1957), chairman of Civic Platform; President of European Council (2014–19) and Prime Minister of Poland (2007–14; 2023–)
- Kazimierz Tyszka (1872–1951), Minister of Railways (1923–25), in Władysław Grabski's government
- Aleksandra Uznańska-Wiśniewska, Polish–Thai politician, political scientist, and humanitarian, member of the Sejm (since 2023)
- Aleksander Wachniewski (1891–1976), engineer and politician, government plenipotentiary in Wrocław (1945–1947)
- Lech Wałęsa (born 1943), trade unionist who started dismantling of the Soviet bloc, the Nobel Peace Prize in 1983, second President of the Third Polish Republic (1990–95)
- Ludwik Waryński (1856–1889), socialist activist in the 19th century
- Wanda Wasilewska (1905–1964), communist activist during World War II
- Edward Werner (1878–1945), born in Poland to parents of German origin; vice-Minister of Finance, and Polish diplomat during World War II
- Alexander Wielopolski (1803–1877), count, Marquis of Gonzaga, statesman
- Wincenty Witos (1874–1945), politician of the agrarian party
- Stanisław Wojciechowski (1869–1953), second President of the Second Polish Republic (1922–26)
- Walery Antoni Wróblewski (1836–1908), politician, insurgency commander
- Joanna Wronecka (born 1958), Ambassador to the UN
- August Zaleski (1883–1972), second President of Poland in exile (1947–72)
- Jan Zamoyski (1542–1605), chancellor and grand hetman of the crown
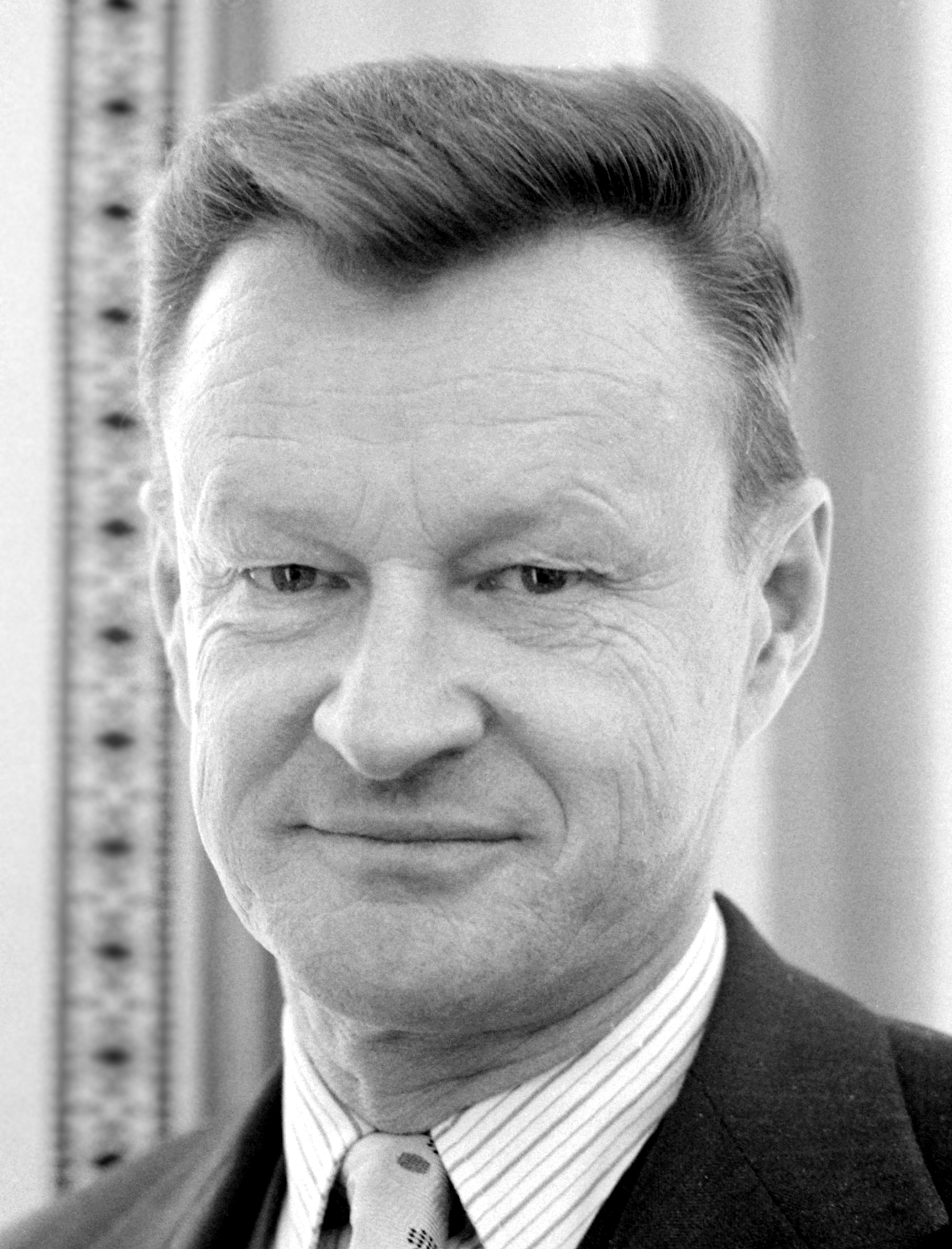
Brzeziński

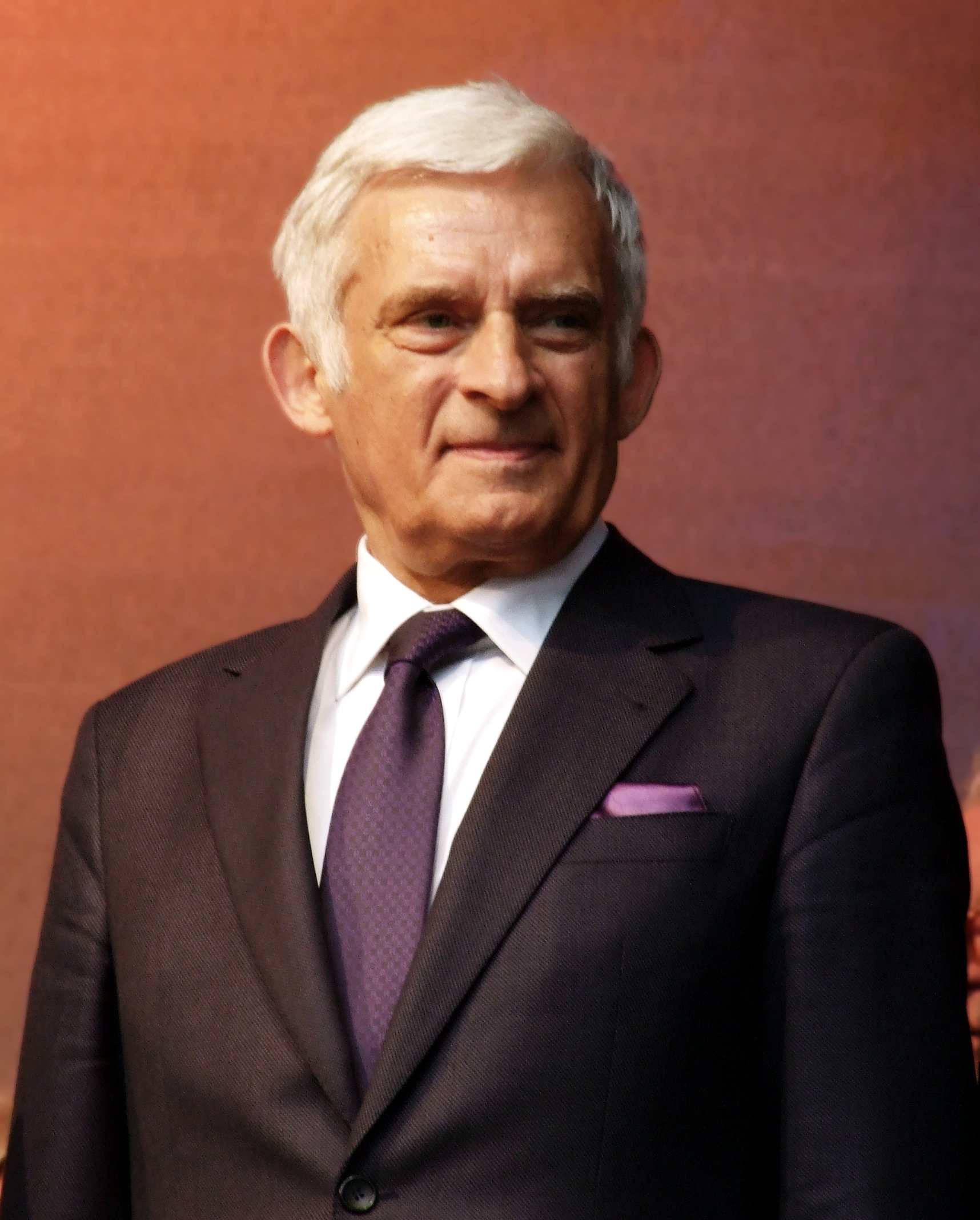
Buzek

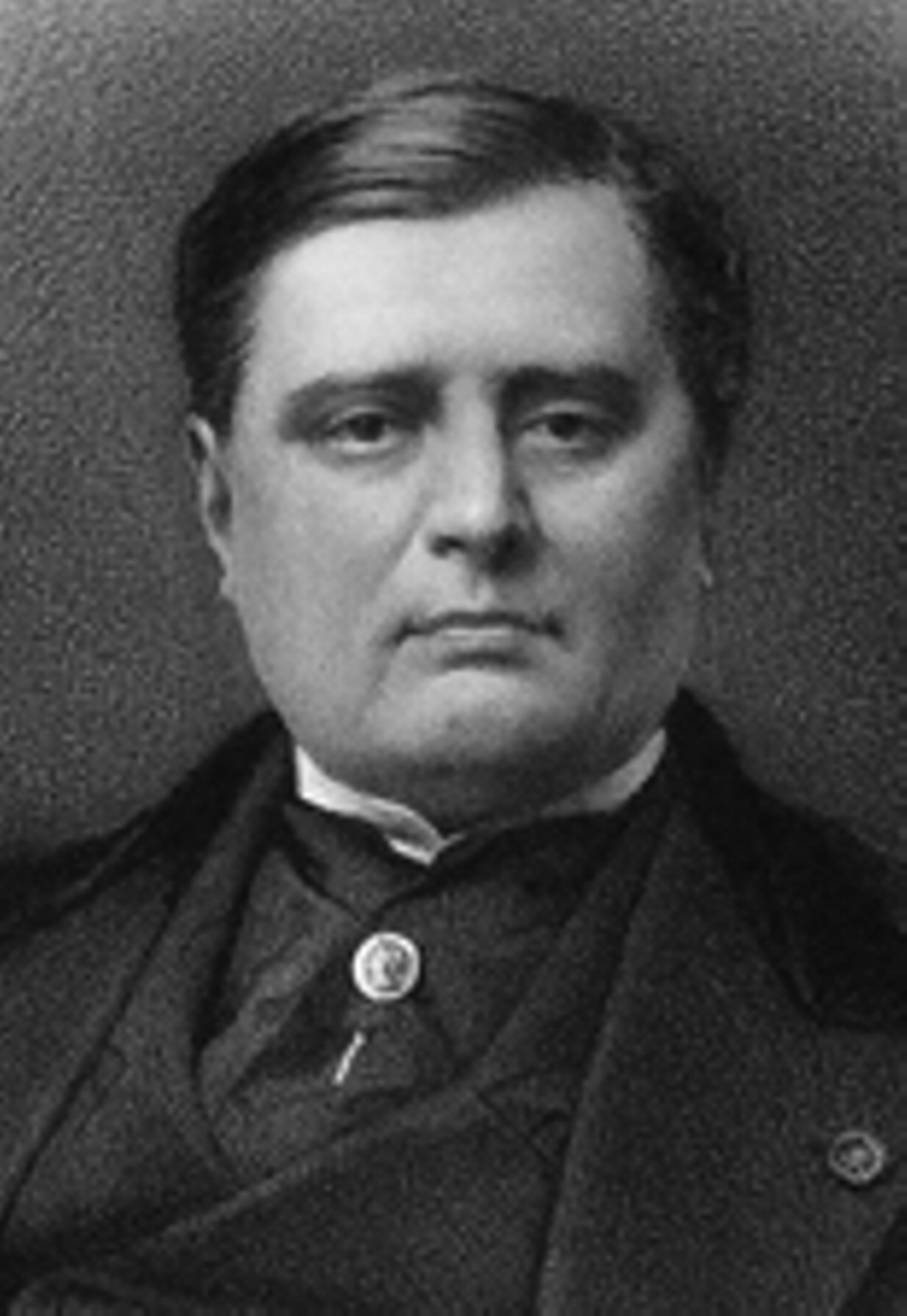
Colonna-Walewski

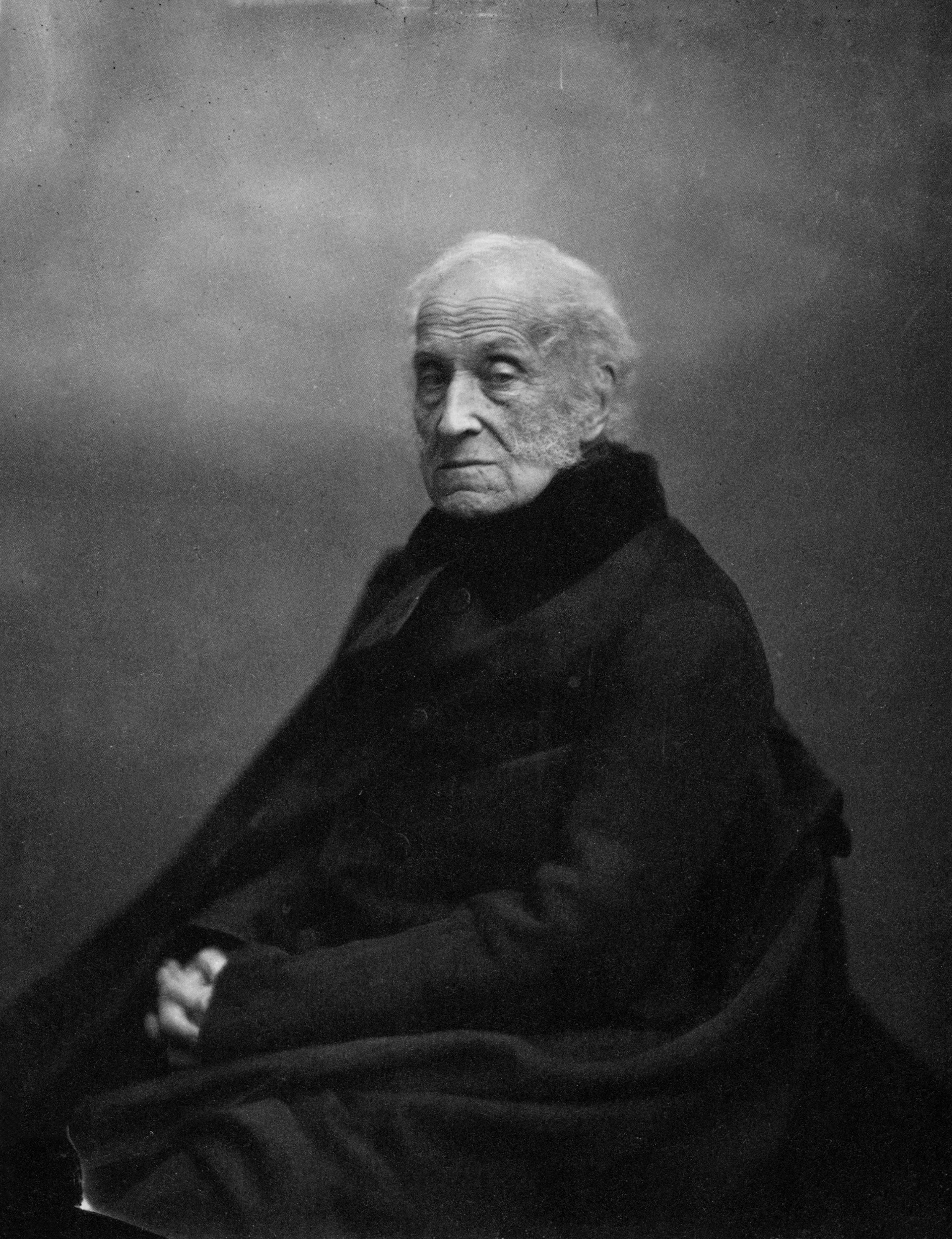
Czartoryski

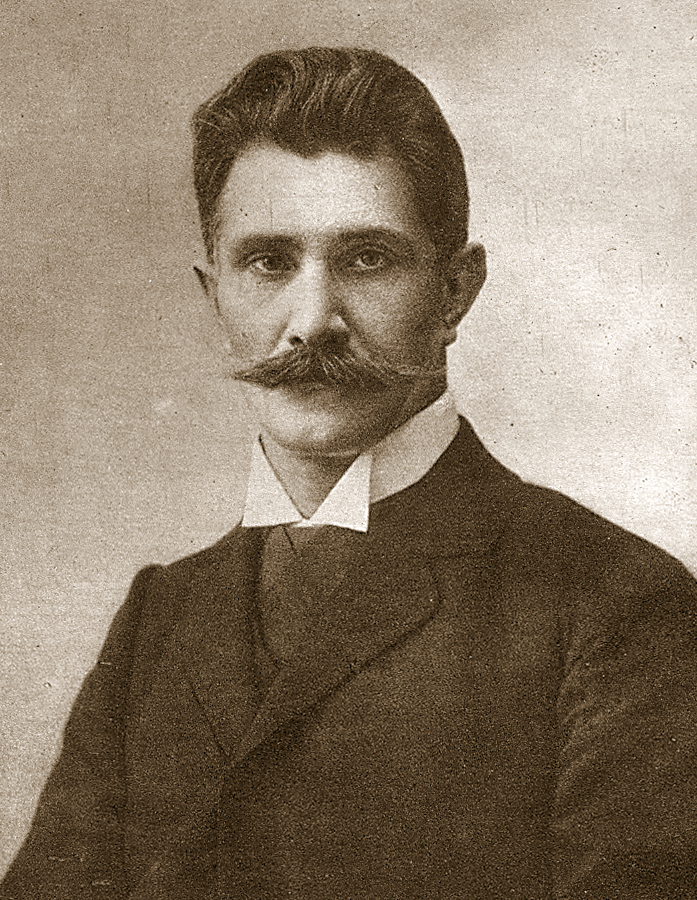
Daszyński

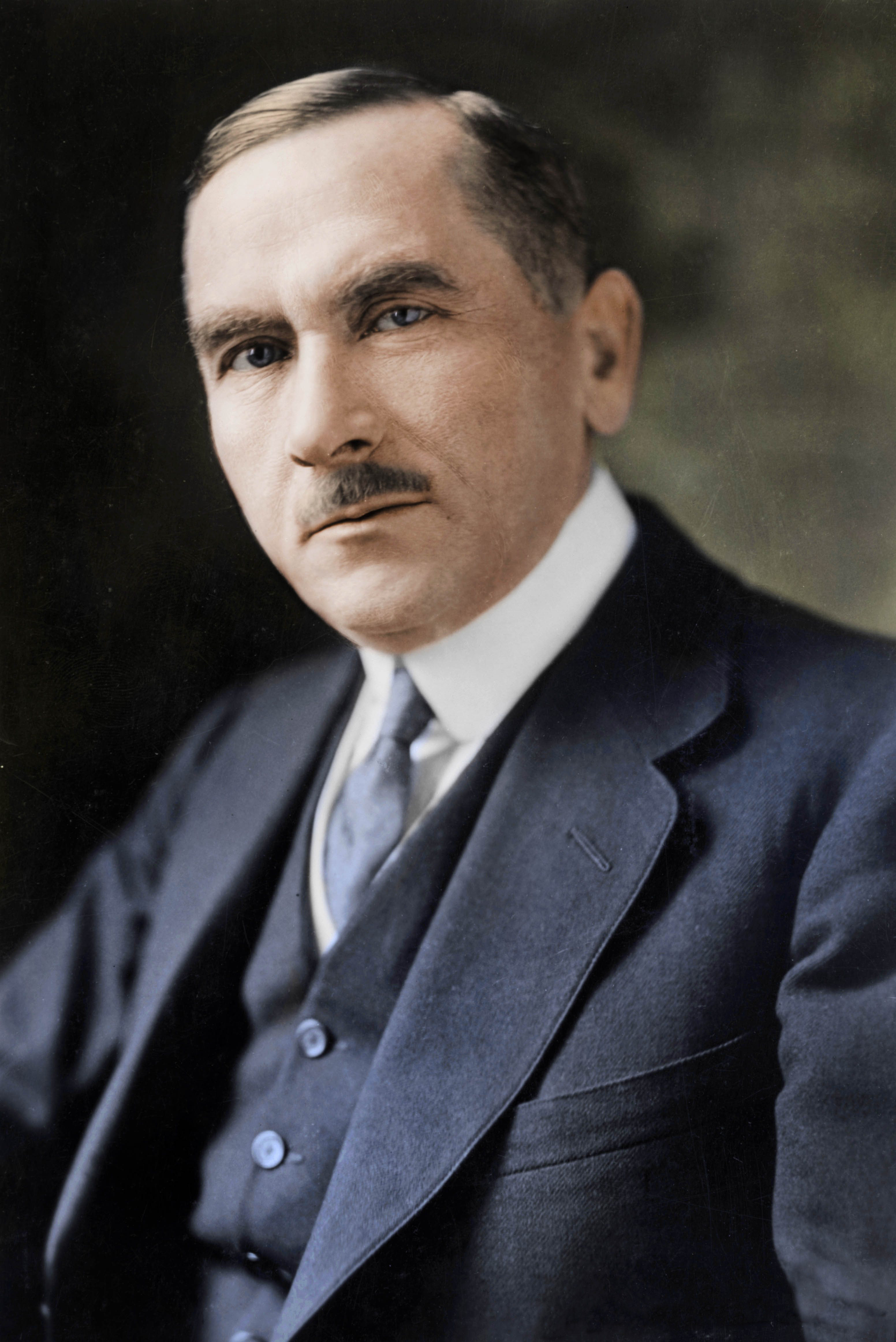
Dmowski

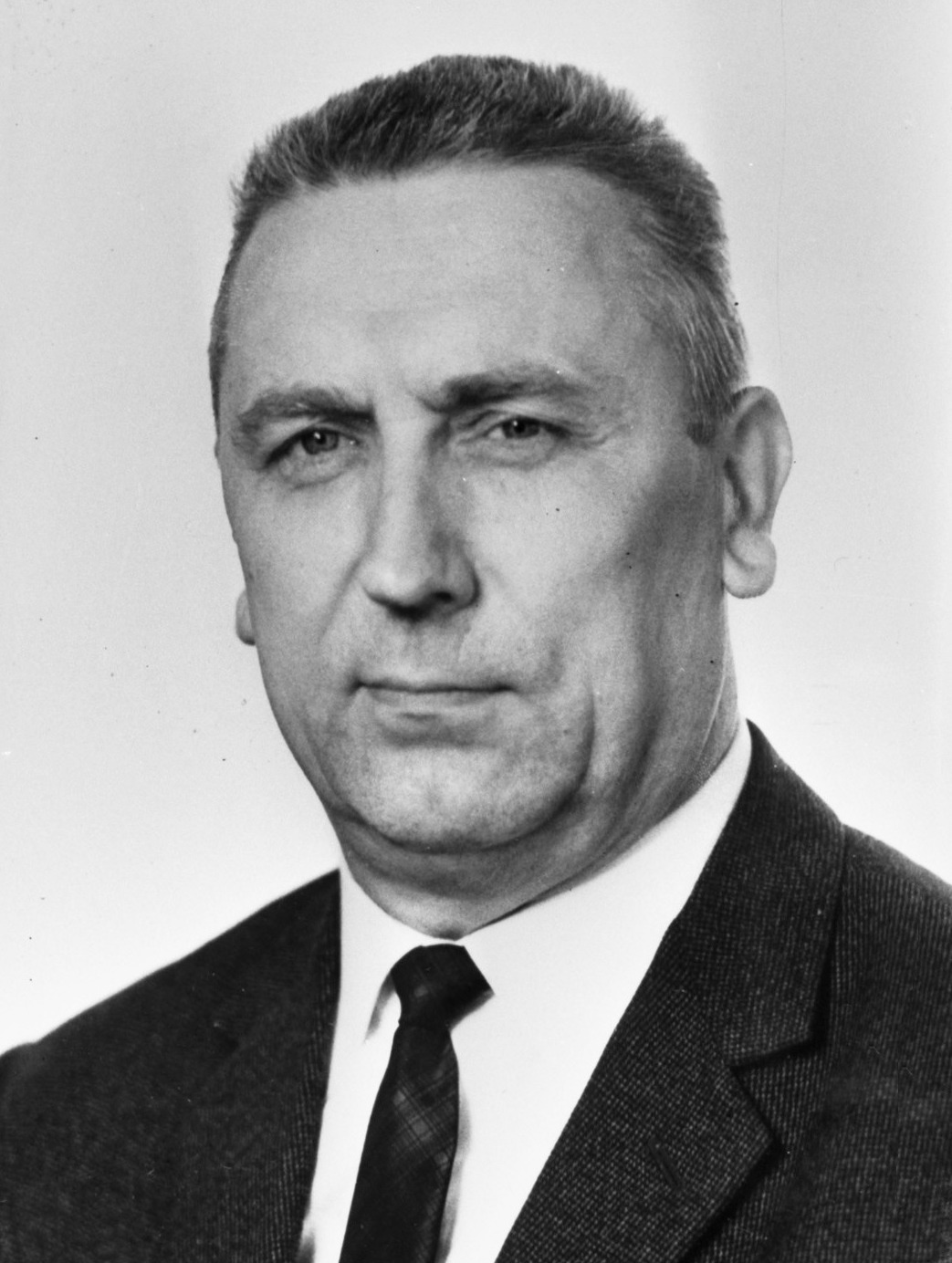
E. Gierek

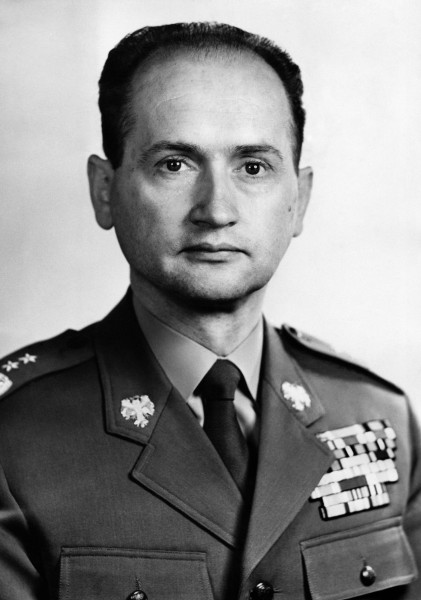
Jaruzelski

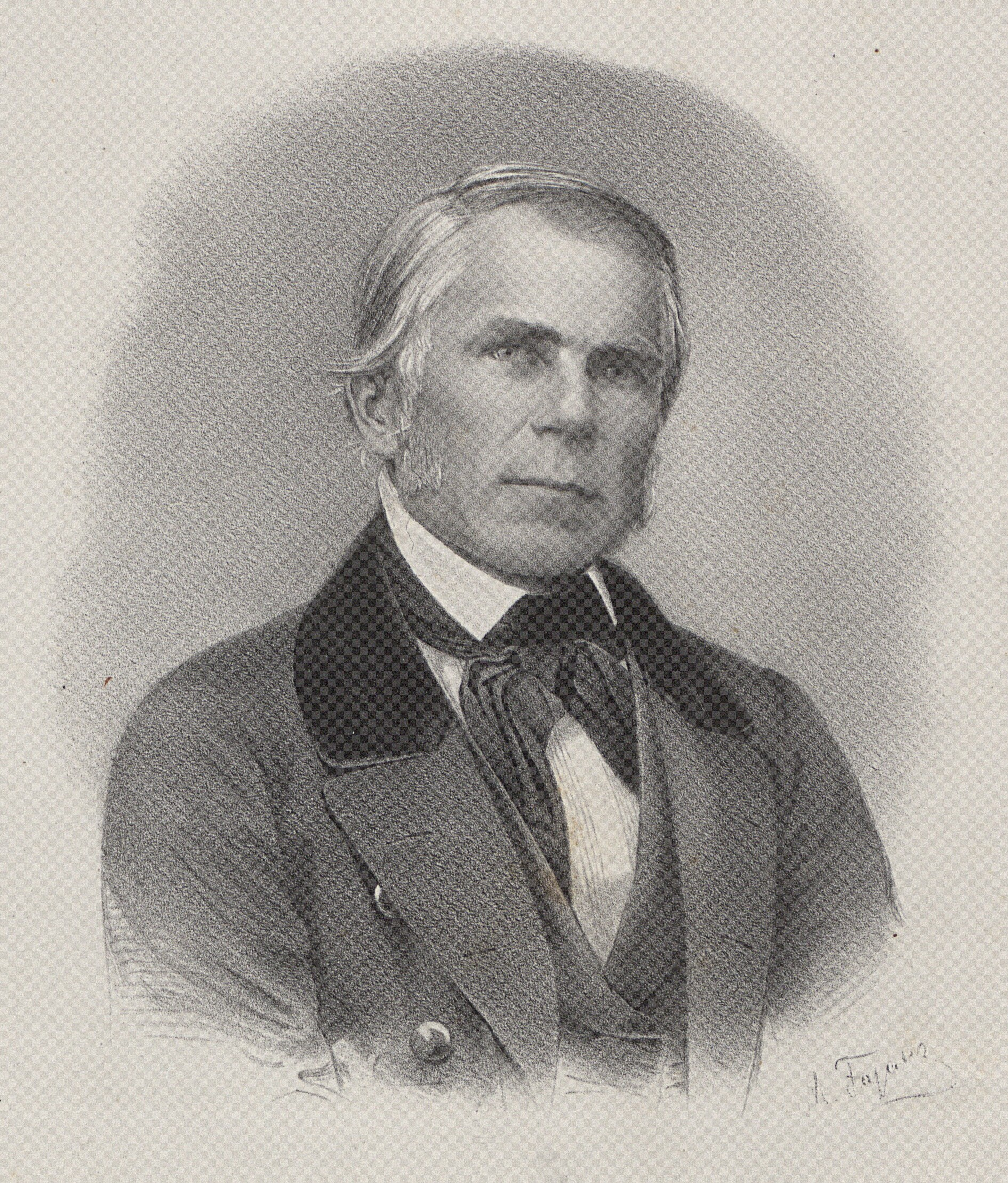
Jastrzębowski

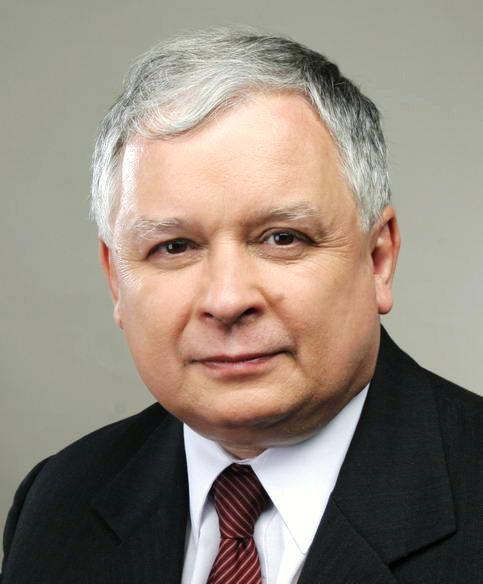
L. Kaczyński

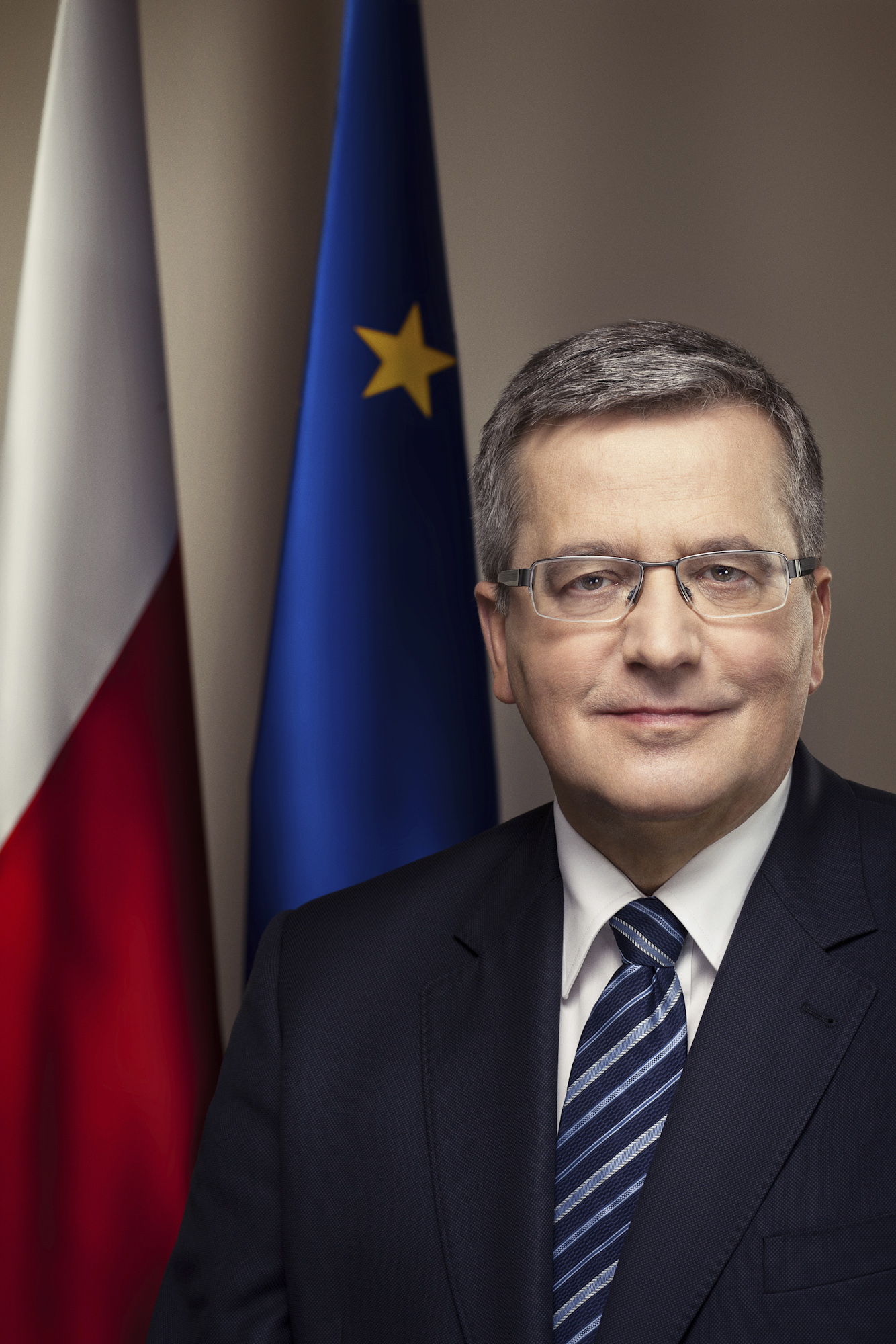
Komorowski

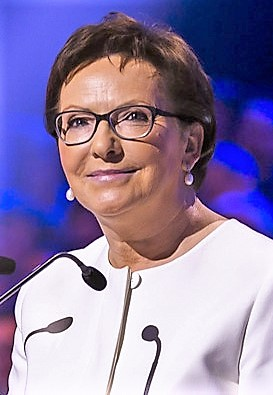
Kopacz

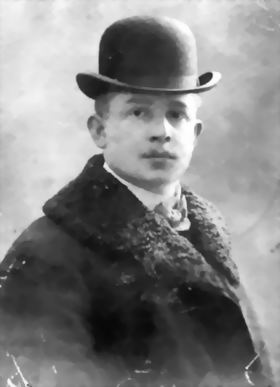
Korfanty

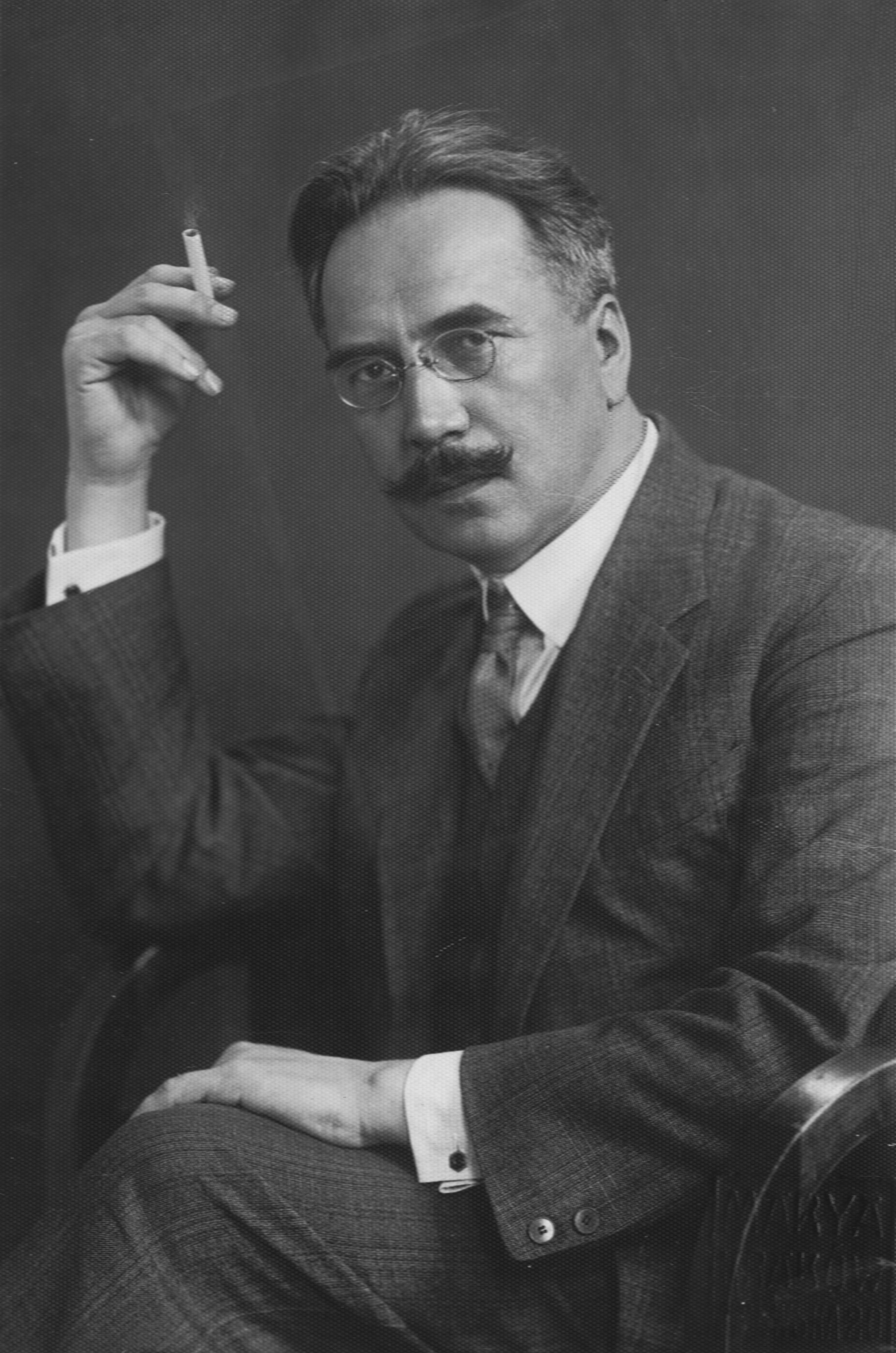
Kot

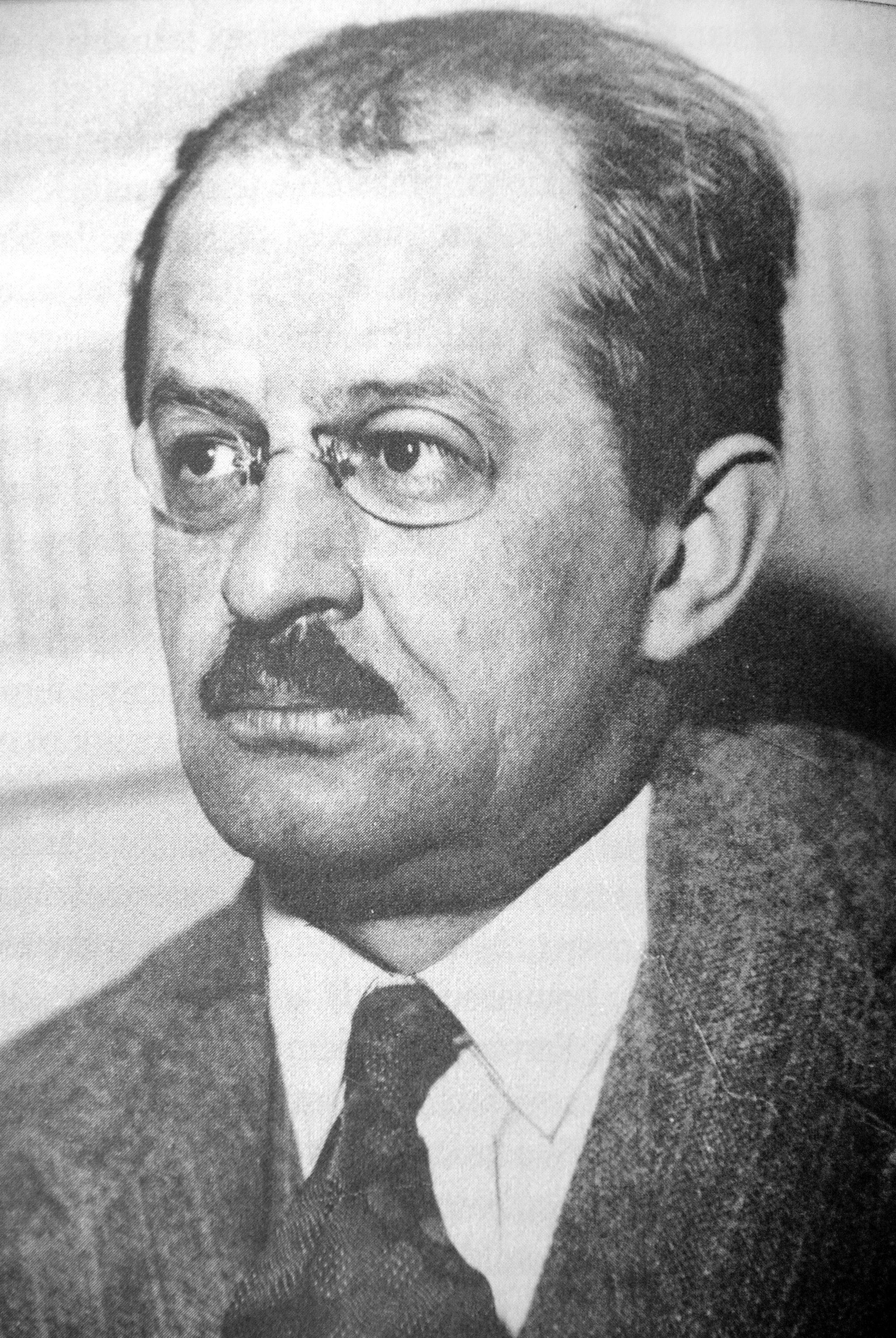
Kozłowski

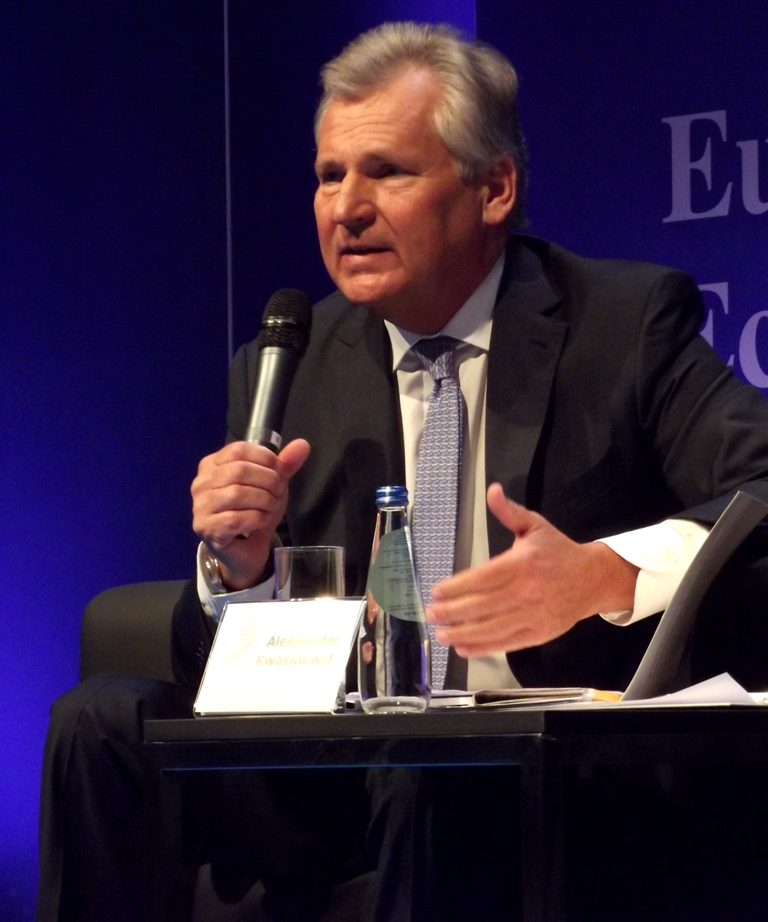
Kwaśniewski

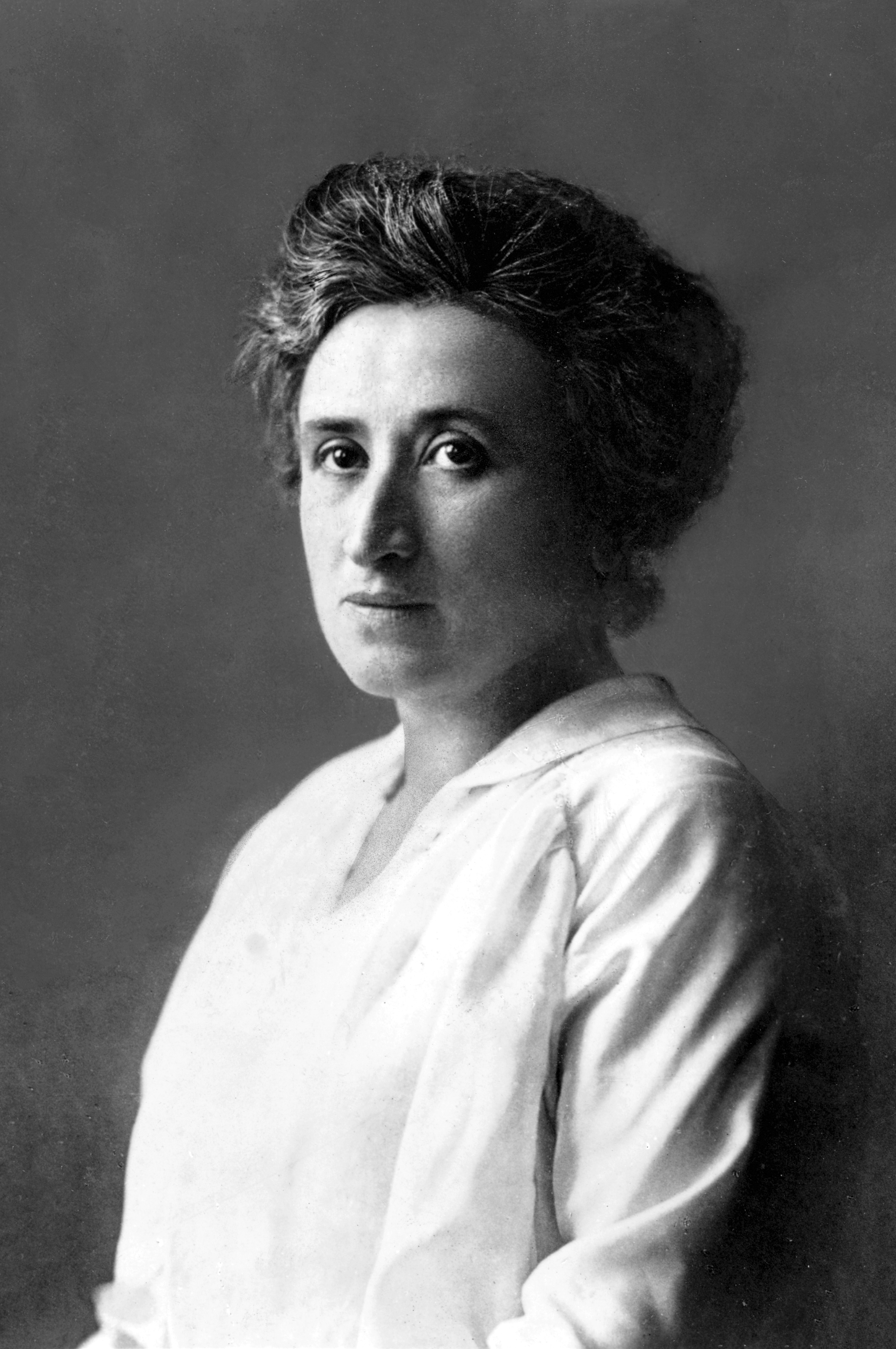
Luxemburg

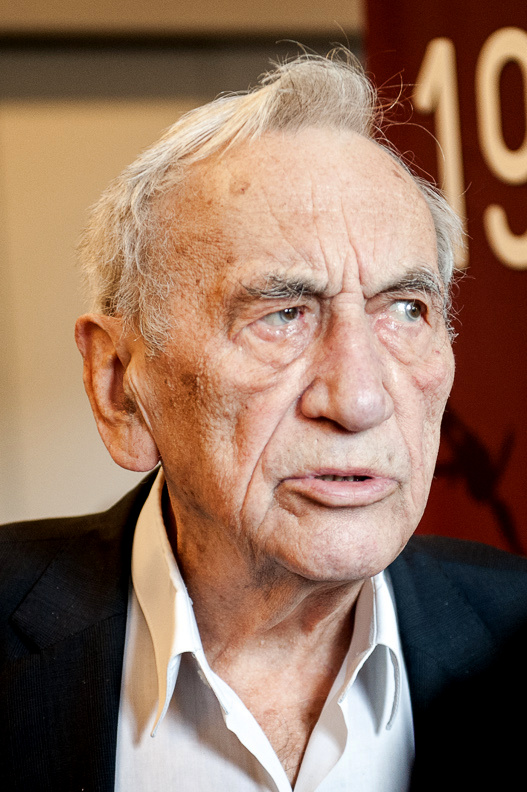
Mazowiecki

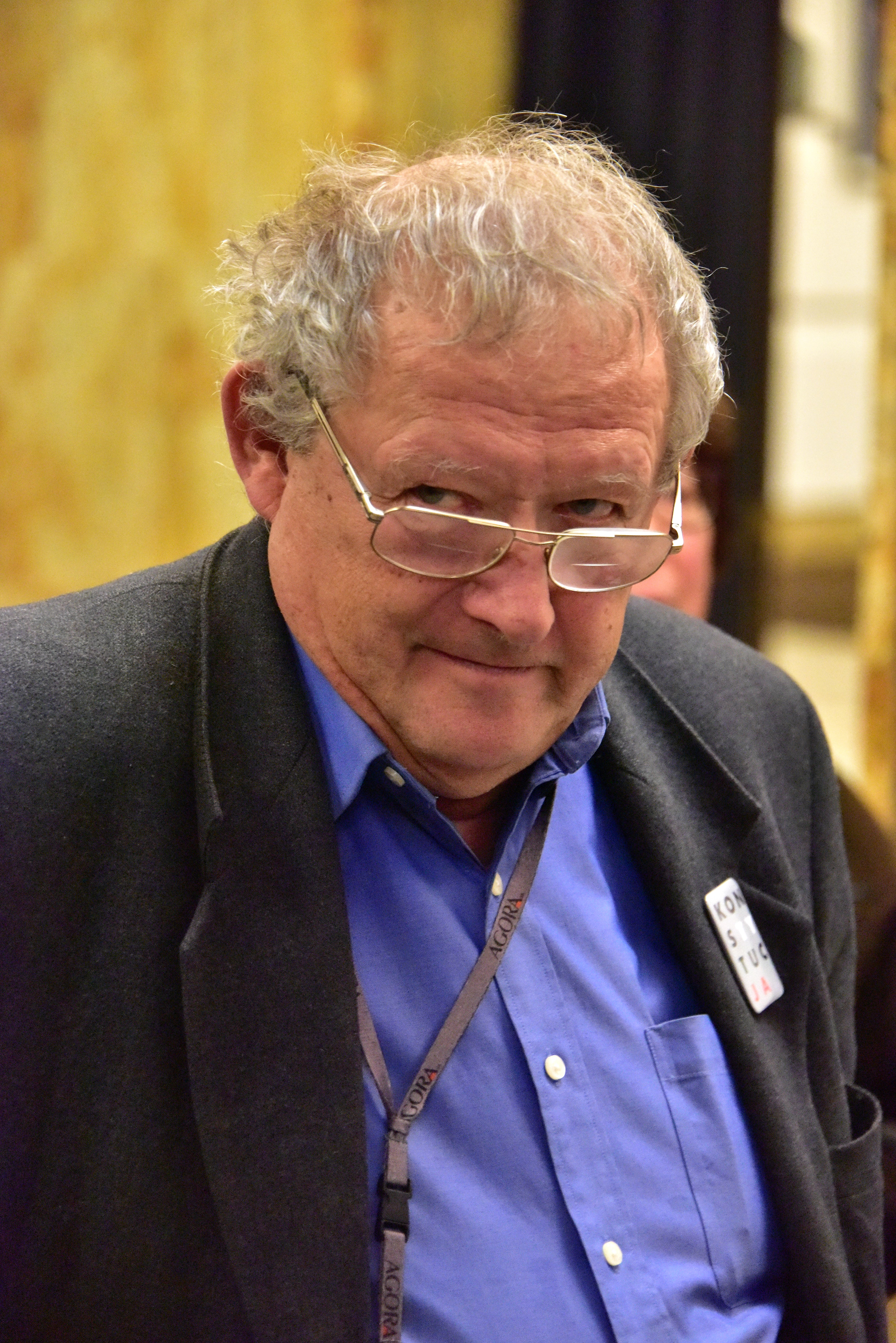
Michnik

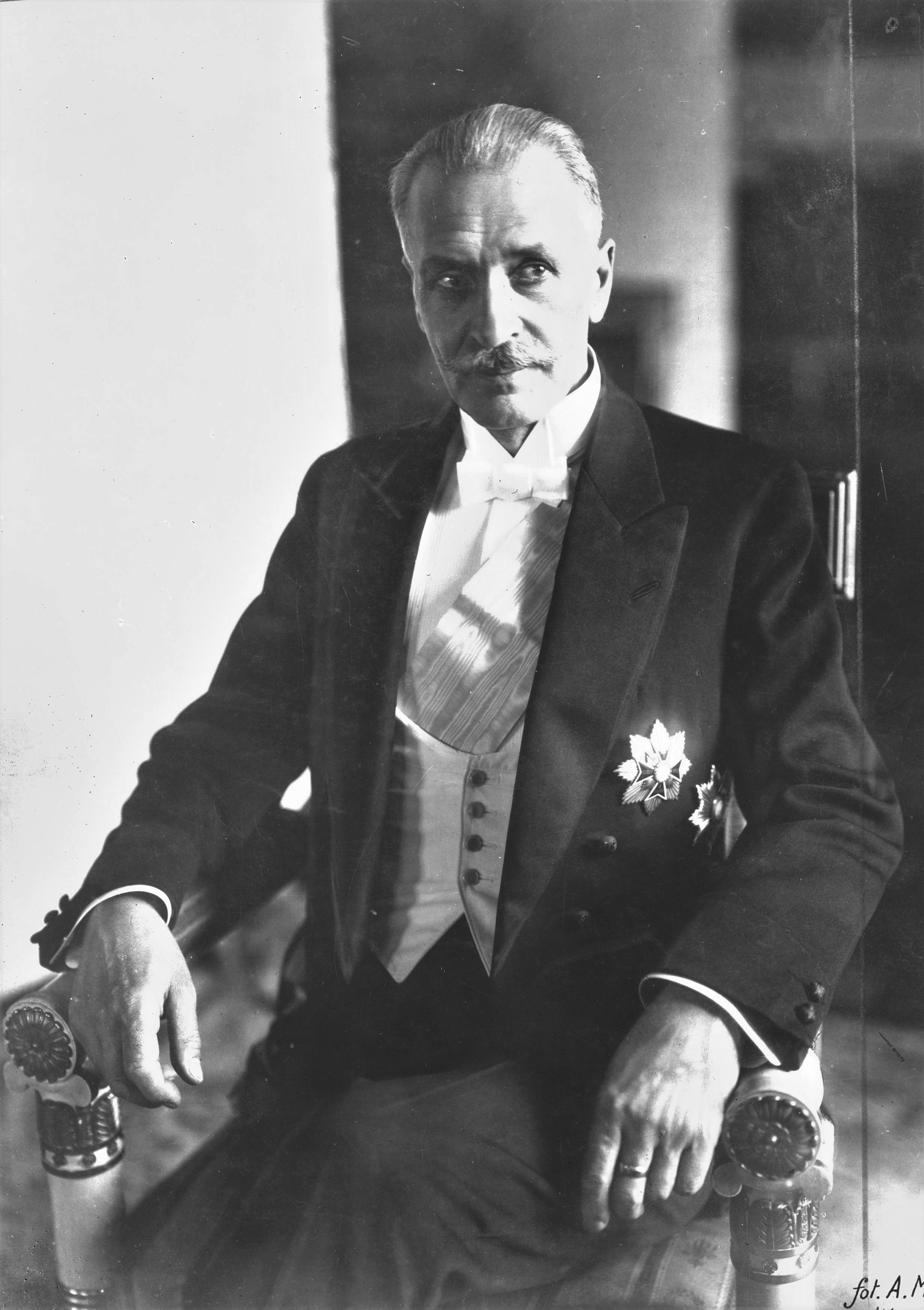
Mościcki

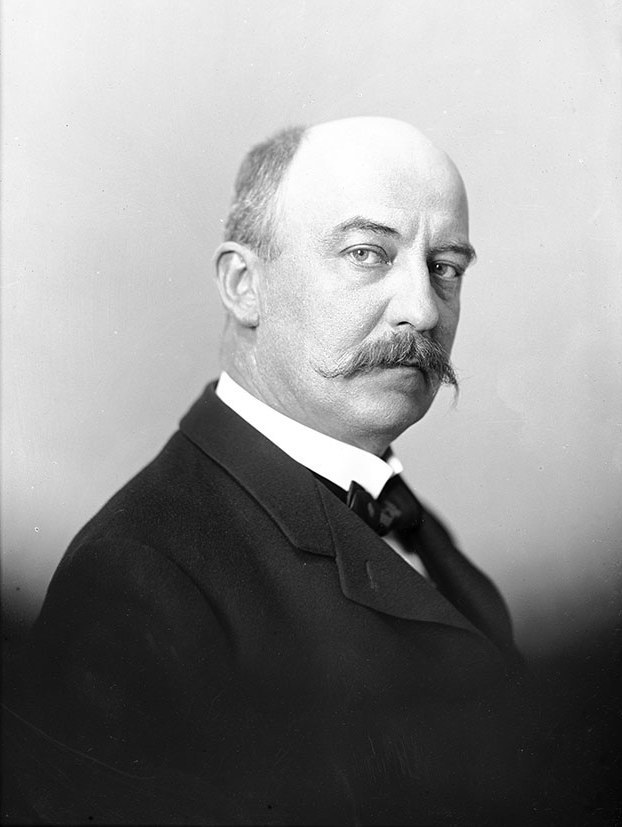
Narutowicz

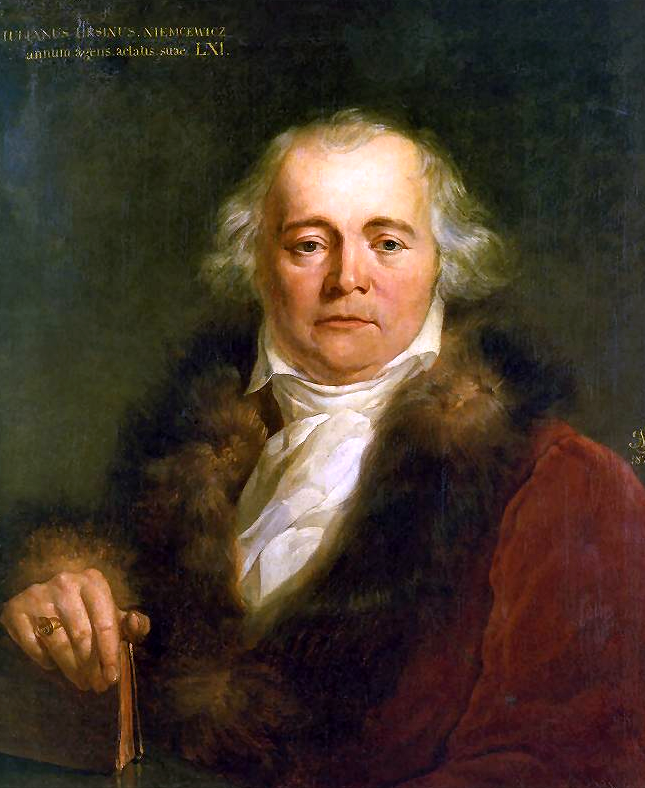
Niemcewicz

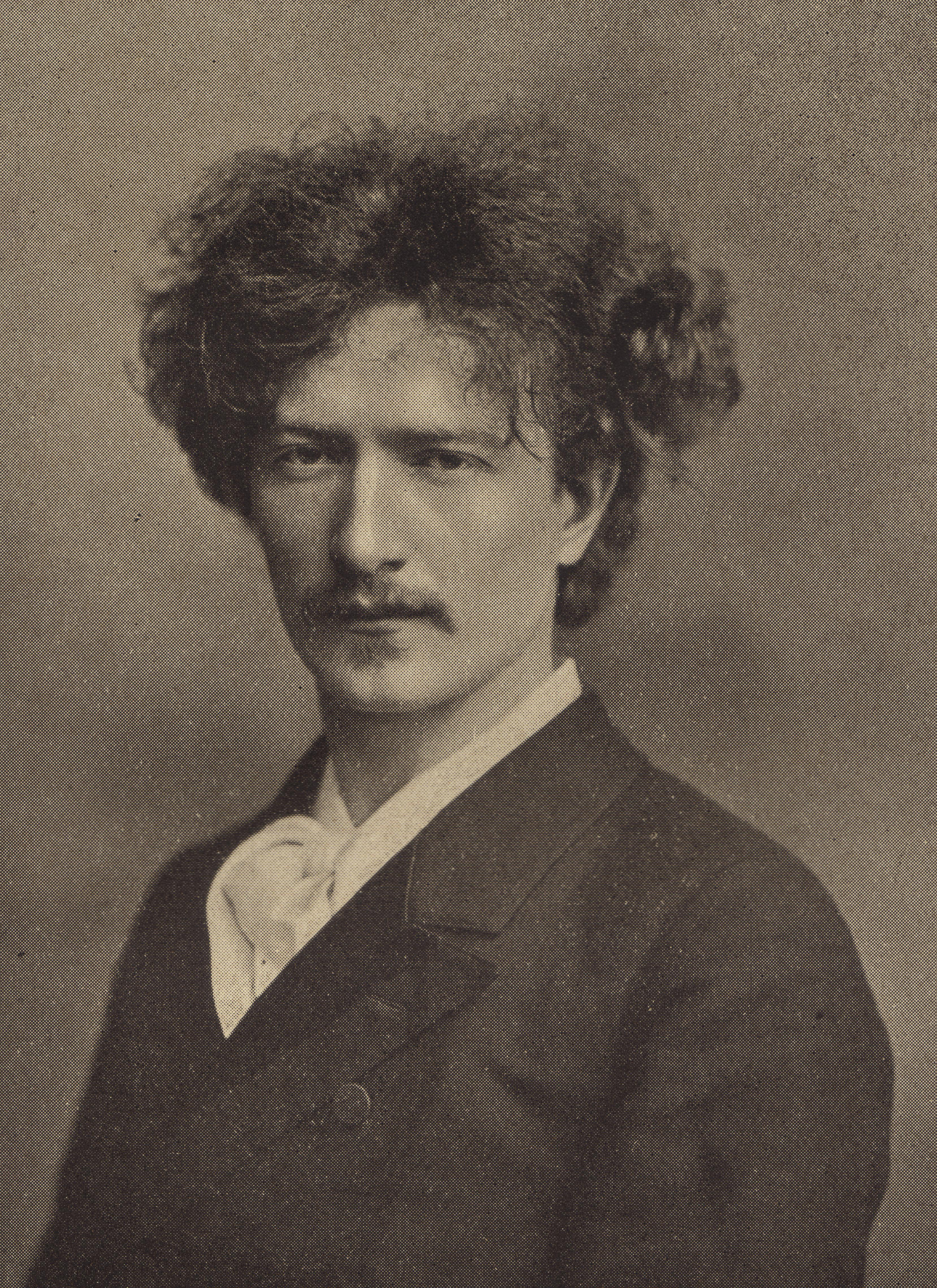
Paderewski

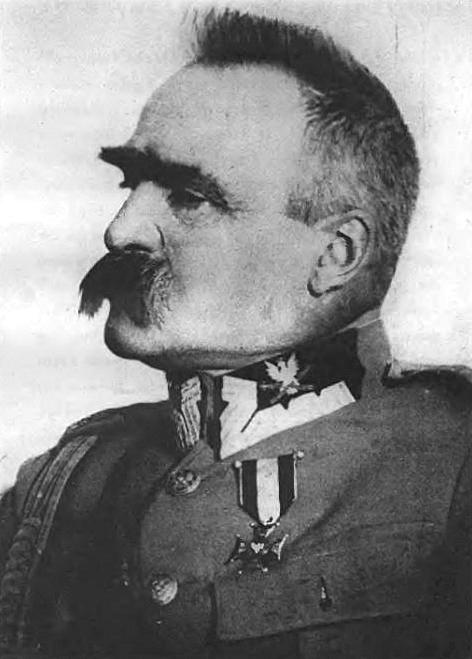
Piłsudski

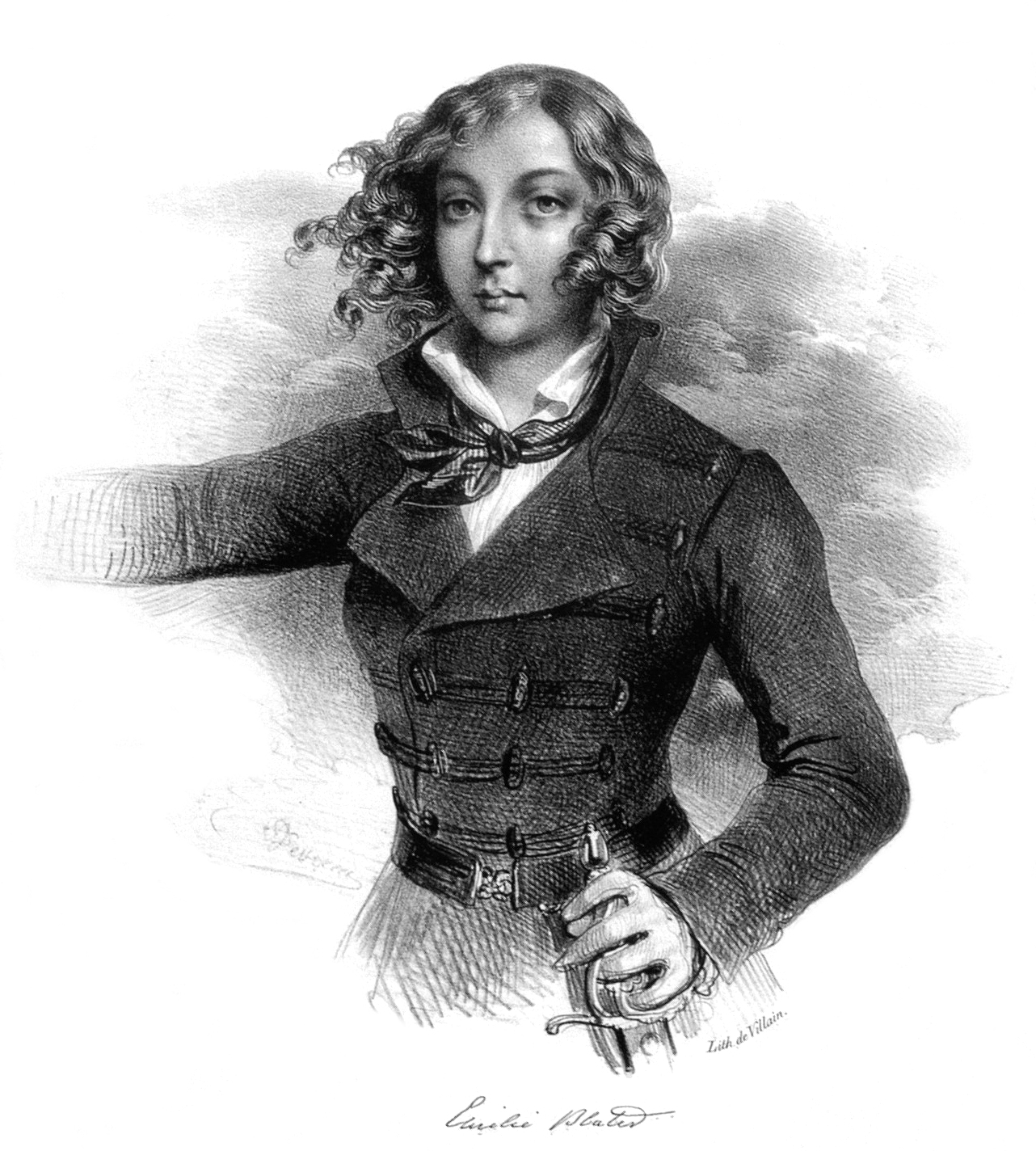
Plater

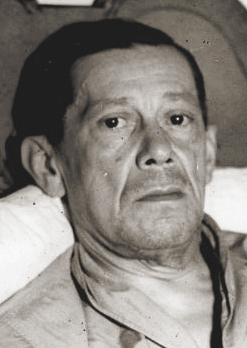
Retinger

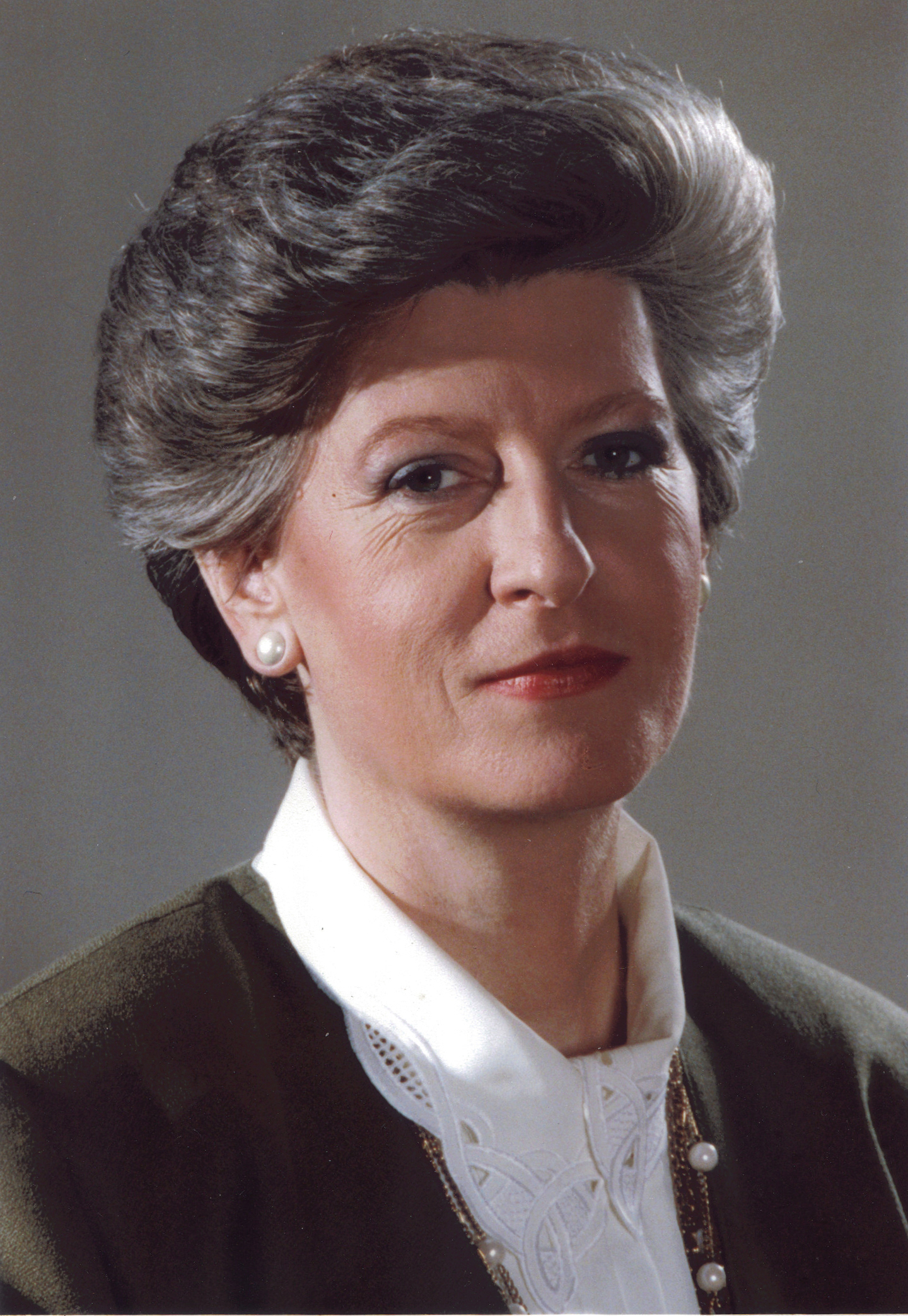
Suchocka

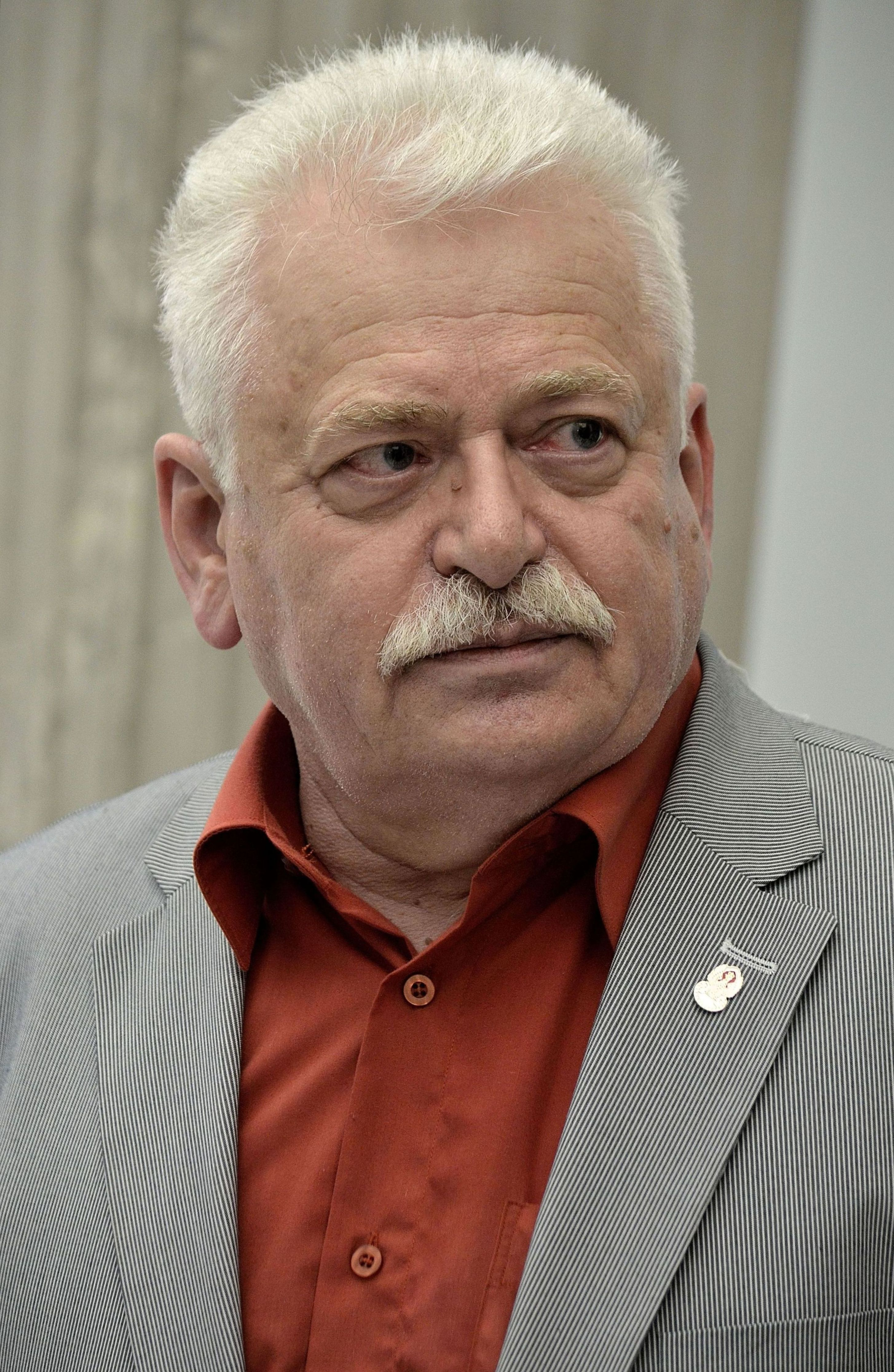
Szeremietiew

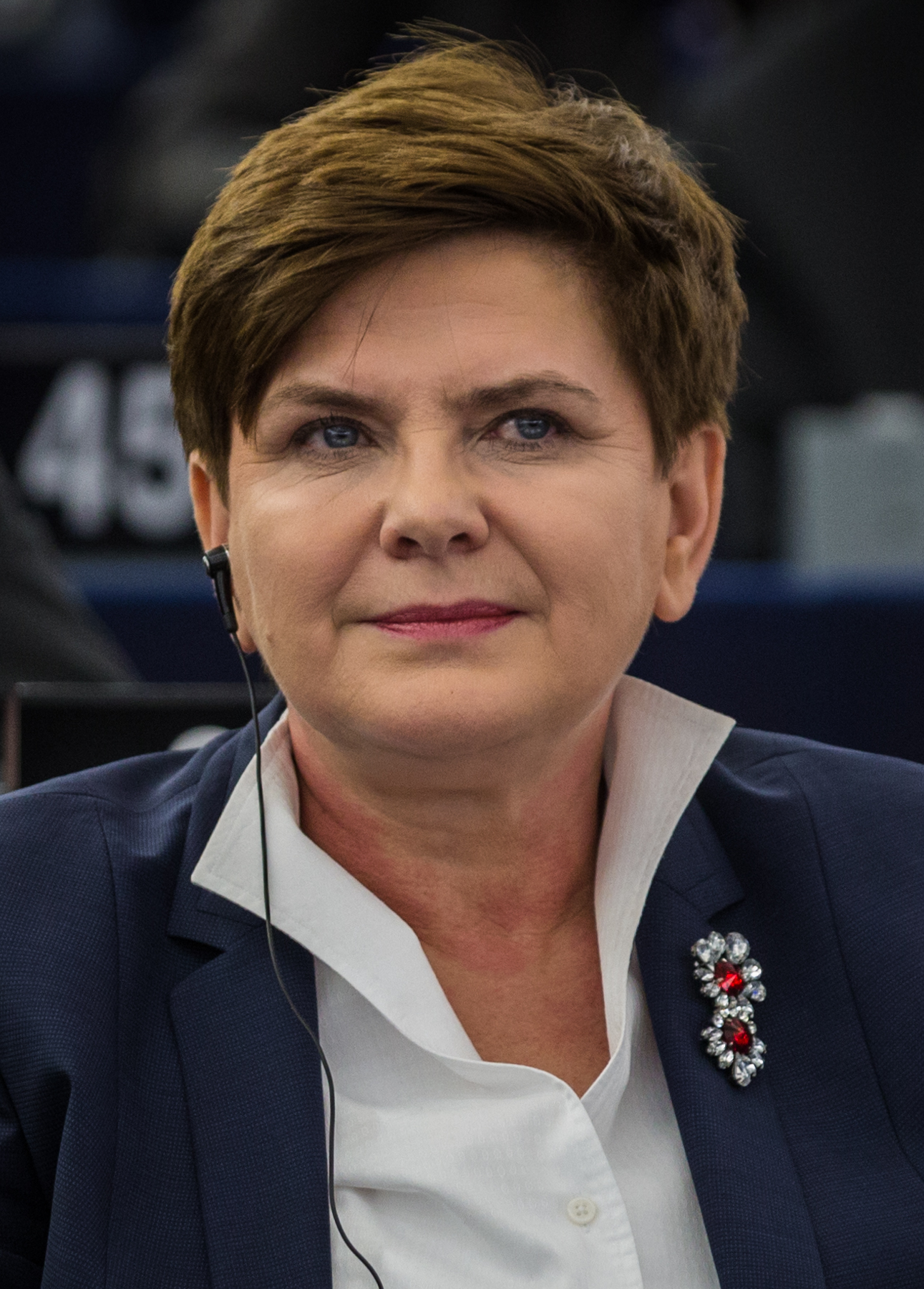
Szydło

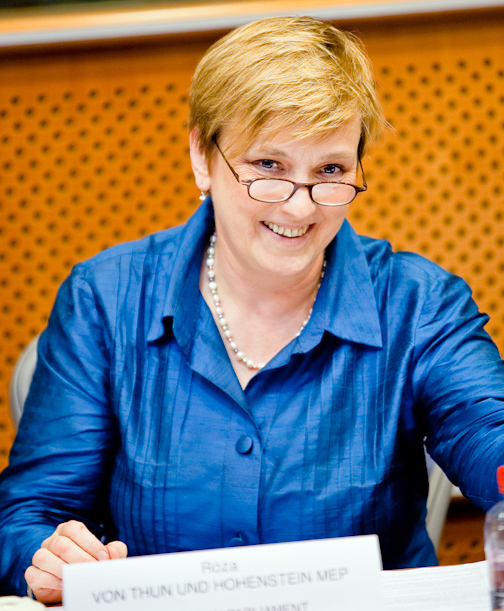
Thun

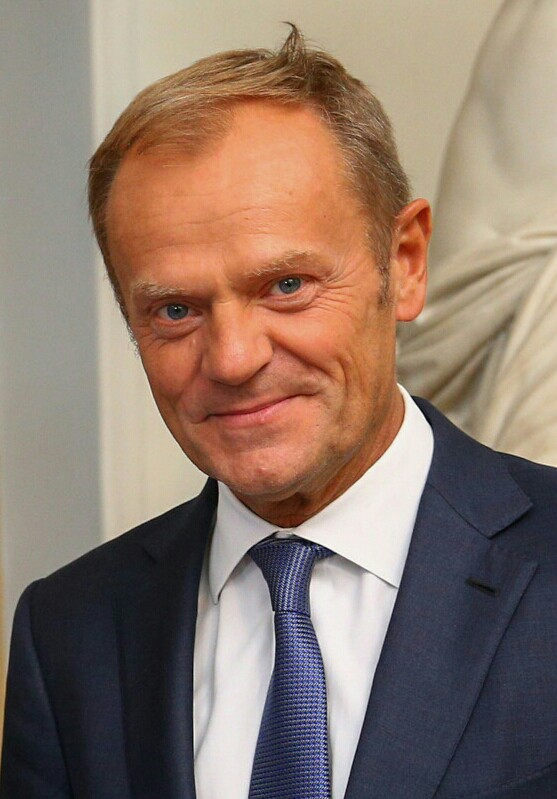
Tusk

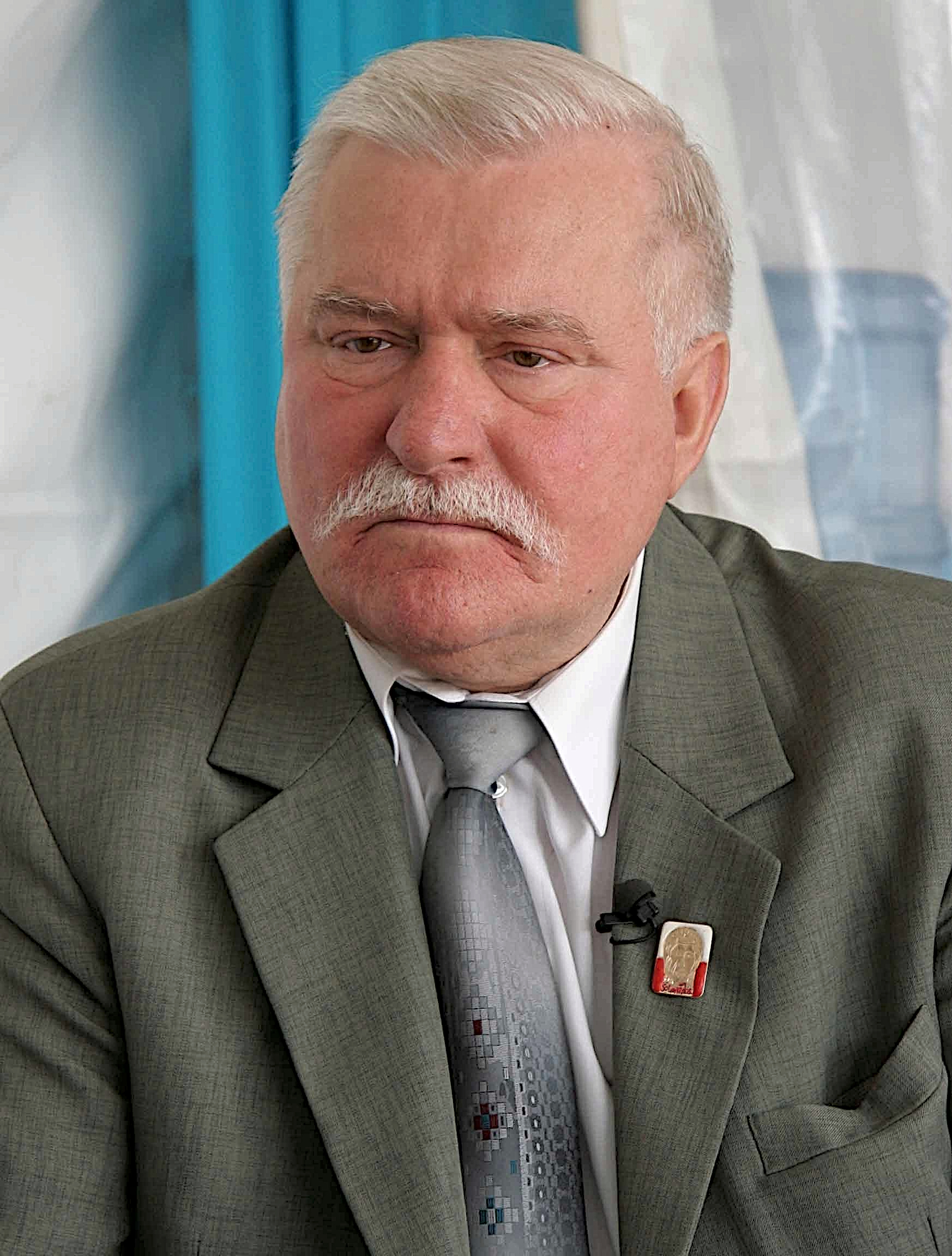
Wałęsa

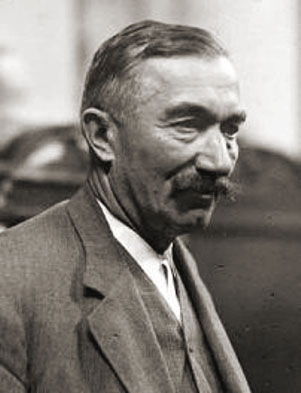
Witos

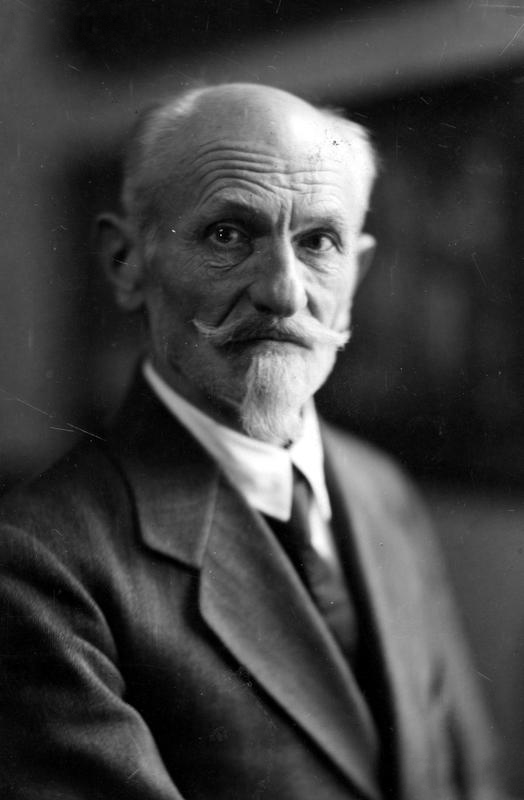
Wojciechowski

== Diplomacy ==
- Władysław Bartoszewski (1922–2015), foreign affairs minister of III RP (1995; 2000–2001)
- Józef Beck (1894–1944), foreign affairs minister of II RP (1932–1939)
- Alois Friedrich von Brühl (1739–1793), Polish-Saxon diplomat, starost of Warsaw
- Matthew Bryza (born 1964), American diplomat
- Włodzimierz Cimoszewicz (born 1950), foreign affairs minister of III RP (2001–2005)
- Adam Jerzy Czartoryski (1770–1861), Polish diplomat; Russian Imperial foreign minister (1804–1806)
- Władysław Czartoryski (1828–1894), prince, the main diplomatic agent of the National Government (1863–1864)
- Roman Dmowski, foreign affairs minister of II RP (1923)
- Bronisław Geremek, foreign affairs minister of III RP (1997–2000)
- Agenor Maria Gołuchowski, count, foreign affairs minister of Austria-Hungary (1895–1906)
- Krzysztof Grzymułtowski, diplomat and voivod of Poznań, author of the Eternal Peace Treaty with Russia (1686)
- Stanisław Janikowski, diplomat in Rome, to Holy See (1927–1954)
- Wacław Jędrzejewicz (1893–1993)
- Julian Klaczko (1825–1906), Polish diplomat
- Stanisław Kot, historian, politician, diplomat. Polish ambassador to the Soviet Union (1941–1942), Italy (1945–1947).
- Józef Lipski, Polish ambassador to Germany (1933–1939)
- Juliusz Łukasiewicz, Polish ambassador to the Soviet Union (1934–1936) and France (1936–1939)
- Ivan Maysky (1884–1975), Soviet diplomat
- Stefan Meller, foreign affairs minister of III RP (2005–2006)
- Lewis Bernstein Namier (1888–1960), British diplomat and historian
- Andrzej Olechowski, foreign affairs minister of III RP (1993–1995)
- Ignacy Paderewski, foreign affairs minister of II RP (1919) and third prime minister of Poland
- Stanisław Patek, foreign affairs minister of II RP (1919–1920)
- Edward Bernard Raczyński, count, Polish ambassador to the United Kingdom (1934–1945) and foreign affairs minister (1941–1943)
- Adam Rapacki, foreign affairs minister of communist Poland (1956–1968)
- Józef Retinger (1888–1960), advocate for a European Union
- Tadeusz Romer, foreign affairs minister of the Polish Government in Exile (1943–1944)
- Dariusz Rosati, foreign affairs minister of III RP (1995–1997)
- Adam Daniel Rotfeld, foreign affairs minister of III RP (2005)
- Radosław Sikorski, foreign affairs minister of III RP (2007–2014)
- Konstanty Skirmunt, foreign affairs minister of II RP (1921–1922)
- Aleksander Skrzyński, foreign affairs minister of II RP (1922–1923; 1924–1926)
- Krzysztof Skubiszewski (1926– 2010), first foreign affairs minister of III RP (1989–1993)
- Romuald Spasowski, Polish ambassador to the United States (1955–1961; 1978–1981)
- Jan Szembek, count, foreign affairs deputy secretary (1932–1939)
- Yosef Tekoah (1925–1991), Israeli diplomat and President of the Ben-Gurion University of the Negev
- Andrey Vyshinsky, Soviet jurist and diplomat
- Alexandre Joseph Count Colonna-Walewski, Polish and French foreign affairs minister
- Leon Wasilewski, foreign affairs minister of II RP (1918–1919)
- Bolesław Wieniawa-Długoszowski, general, Polish ambassador to Italy (1938–1940)
- Sergey Yastrzhembsky (born 1953), Russian diplomat
- August Zaleski (1883–1972), foreign affairs minister of II RP (1926–1932)
- Maurycy Klemens Zamoyski (1871–1939), foreign affairs minister of II RP (1924)
- Josef Zieleniec (born 1946), Czech foreign affairs minister
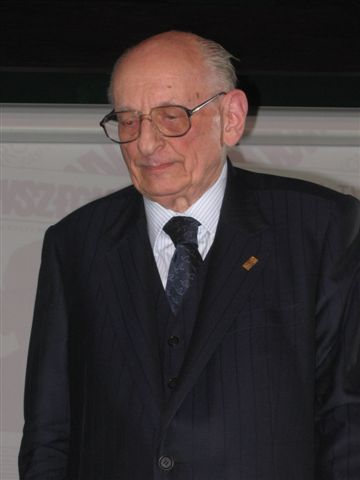
Bartoszewski

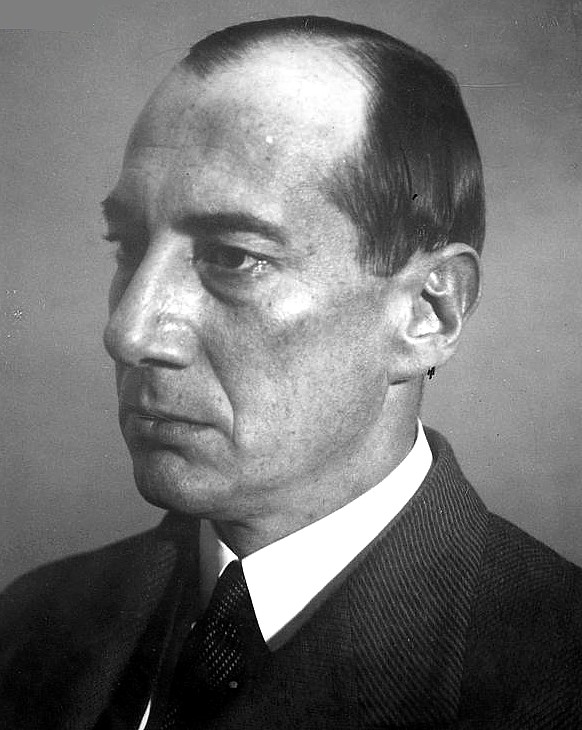
Beck

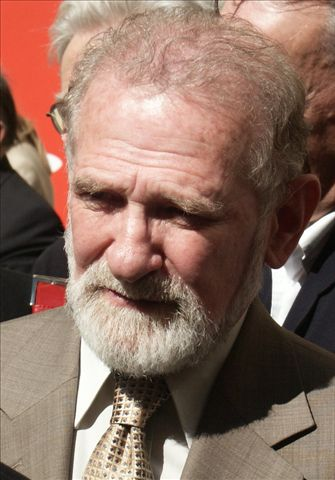
Geremek

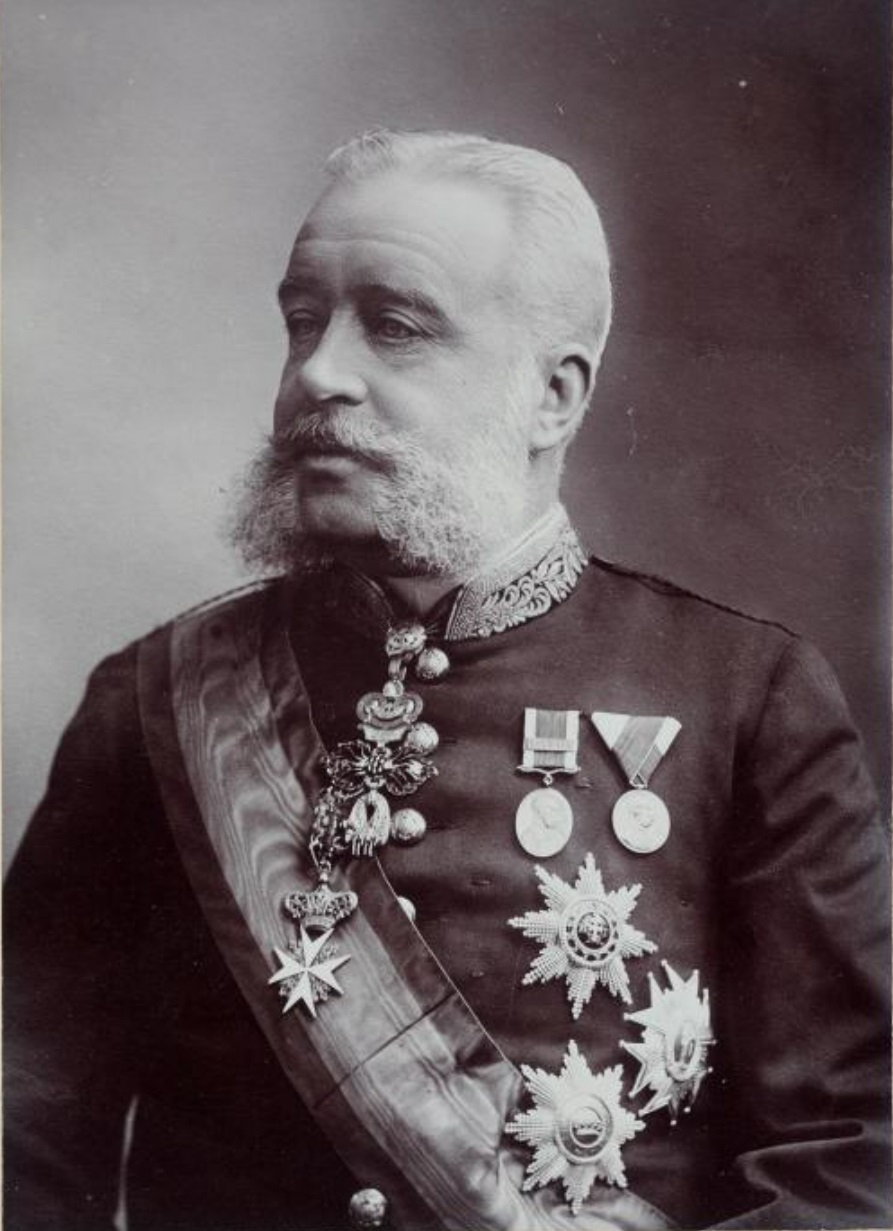
A. M. Gołuchowski

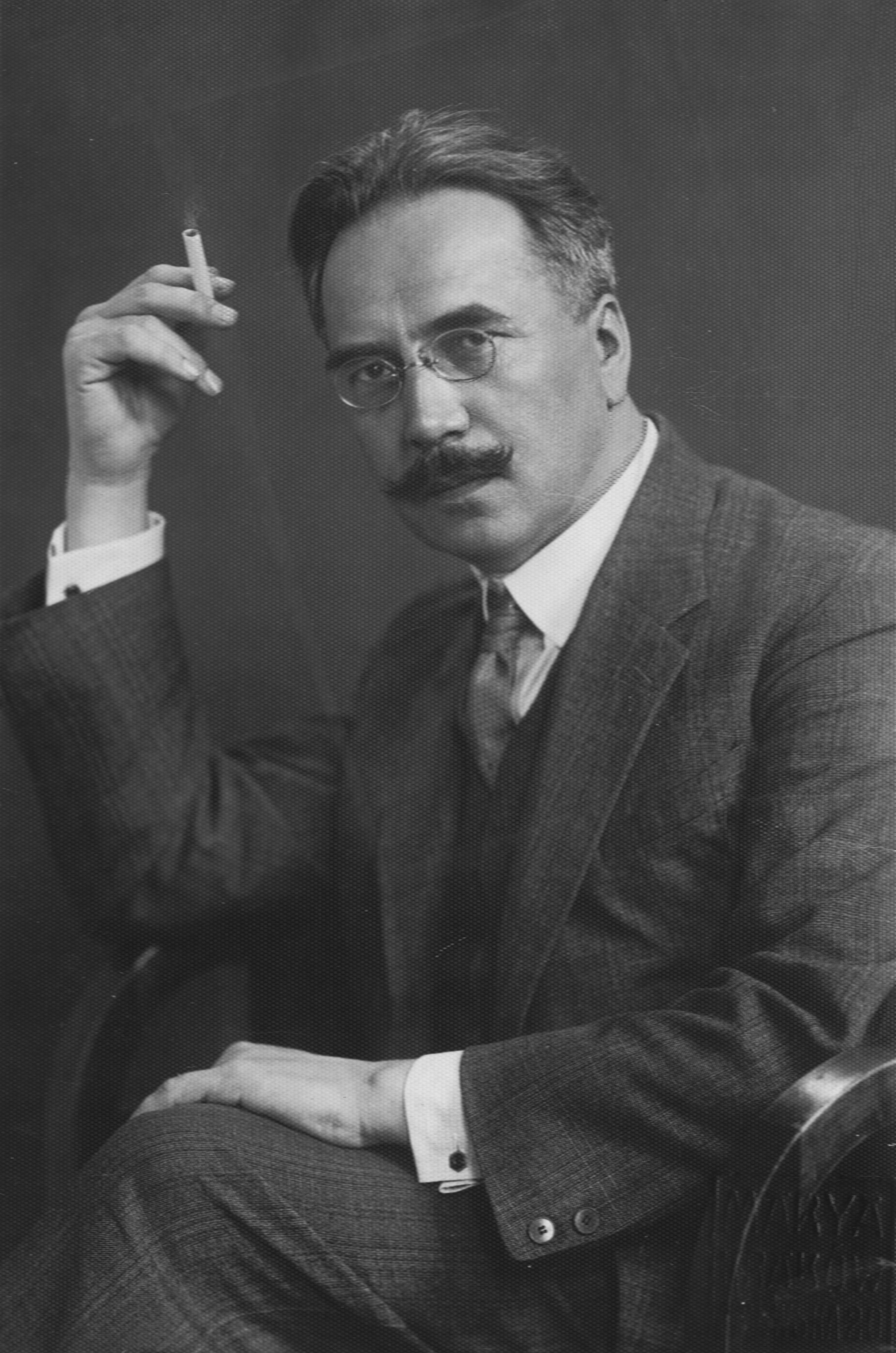
Kot

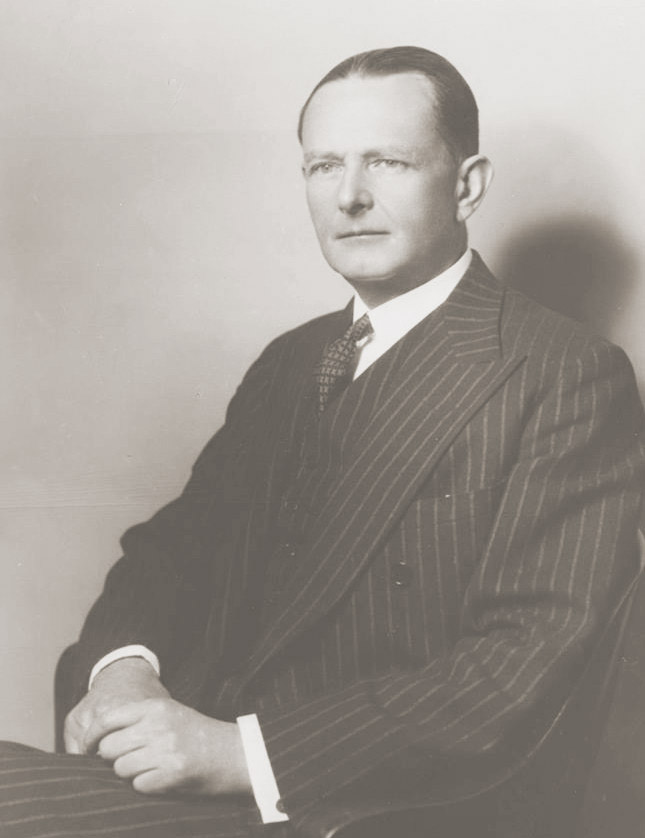
Raczyński

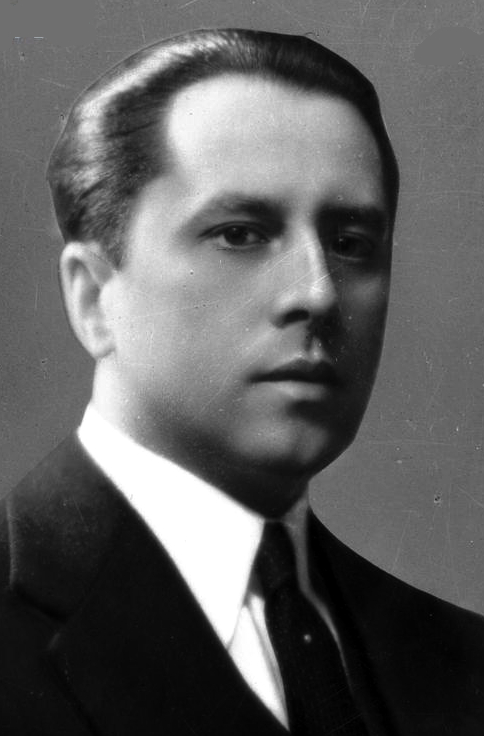
Romer

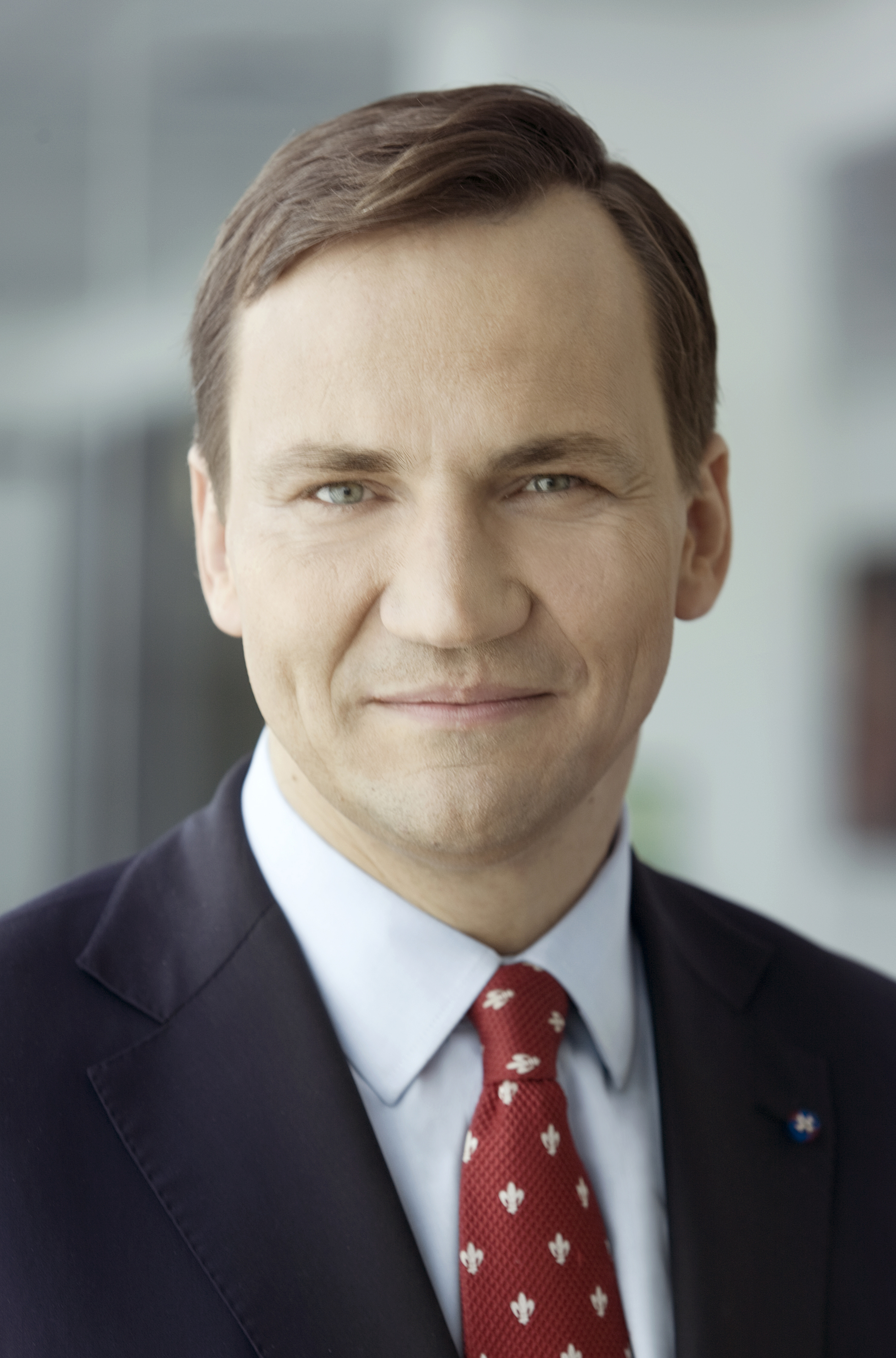
R. Sikorski

Walewski

== Military ==
- Władysław Anders, general, military commander during the Battle of Monte Cassino (1944)
- Krzysztof Arciszewski, general of artillery of Holland (1639), and Poland (1646)
- Józef Bem, military commander, commander-in-chief of Hungarian army (1849)
- Janusz Bokszczanin, colonel, last chief of staff of the Home Army (1944–1945)
- Edmond Wilhelm Brillant (1916–2004)
- Moshe Carmel (1911–2003), Israeli Major-General and Israeli Minister of Transportation
- Jan Karol Chodkiewicz, military commander, victor of Kircholm (1605)
- Józef Chyliński, resistance fighter
- Michał Czajkowski (Sadok Pasha) (1804–1886), Polish commander-in-chief of an Ottoman Cossack brigade during the Crimean War (1853–1856)
- Stefan Czarniecki, Field Crown Hetman of Poland (1665)
- Barbara Bronisława Czarnowska (1810–1891), noblewoman, independence fighter and soldier
- Jan Henryk Dąbrowski, general, military commander during the Napoleonic Wars
- Jarosław Dąbrowski, military commander during the January 1863 Uprising and the Paris Commune (1871)
- Henryk Dembiński, military commander in the November uprising and the Hungarian uprising of 1849
- Bolesław Wieniawa-Długoszowski, general, ambassador, nominated President of Poland (1939)
- Józef Dowbor-Muśnicki, general, military commander in the Greater Poland Uprising (1919)
- Bolesław Bronisław Duch, World War II general
- Jerzy Pajaczkowski-Dydynski (1894–2005), soldier in World War I and in the 1920–21 Polish-Soviet War; at his death, he was the oldest man in the United Kingdom (111 years old)
- Emil August Fieldorf, general, last deputy commander-in-chief of the Home Army (1944–1945)
- Wanda Gertz, major, soldier during World War I, Home Army commandant in World War II and in German POW camps
- Józef Haller, politician, commander of the Polish Army in France during World War I
- Stanisław Haller, general, murdered by the NKVD in the 1940 Katyn massacres
- Hava Inbar (died 2024), Lieutenant Colonel of the Israeli Defense Forces and the first female military judge in the world
- Stanisław Jan Jabłonowski, Grand Crown Hetman (1682/3–1702)
- Jan Nowak-Jezioranski (1913–2005), journalist and World War II hero
- Berek Joselewicz, Polish-Jewish colonel in the Kościuszko Uprising and in Napoleon's Polish Legions; commanded the first Jewish military formation in modern history
- Mikołaj Kamieniecki, first Grand Crown Hetman of Poland (1503–1515)
- Werner Kampe, SS Hauptsturmführer war criminal, Kreisleiter of the NSDAP, Mayor of Bydgoszcz
- Michał Karaszewicz-Tokarzewski, general, founder of the resistance movement "Polish Victory Service" (27 September 1939)
- Kazimierz J. Kasperek, most decorated Polish Navy officer of World War II
- Wanda Józefa Maria Kirchmayer, second lieutenant of the Polish Secret Military Organization (1940–1944)
- Tadeusz Klimecki, general, the Chief of the General staff of the Polish Army (1941–1943)
- Tadeusz Bór-Komorowski, general, commander-in-chief of the Home Army (1943–1944), during Warsaw Uprising (1944)
- Stanisław Koniecpolski, Grand Crown Hetman (1632–1646)
- Stanisław Kopański, general, the Chief of the General staff of the Polish Army (1943–1946)
- Tadeusz Kościuszko, Polish and American commander, general and revolutionist
- Jan Kozietulski, colonel, commander during the Napoleonic Wars
- Włodzimierz Krzyżanowski, Polish Union general in the American Civil War; Chopin's first cousin
- Marian Kukiel, World War II general, historian
- Franciszek Latinik, general, military governor of Warsaw during the 1920 Battle of Warsaw
- Aleksander Lisowski, commander of 17th-century Lisowczycy
- Jerzy Sebastian Lubomirski, Prince, Field Crown Hetman (1657–1664), victor at the Battle of Chudniv (Cudnów) (1660)
- Walenty Łukawski, captain in the Bar Confederation, abductor of King Stanisław August Poniatowski
- Stanisław Maczek (1892–1994), commander of the Polish Armored Division; after World War II, commander-in-chief of Polish forces in exile
- Bernard Mond, Polish–Jewish general
- Mieczysław Norwid-Neugebauer, general and minister of Polish–Jewish family
- Leopold Okulicki, general, last commander-in-chief of the Home Army (1944–1945)
- Juliusz Konstanty Ordon, officer in the November uprising (1830–1831)
- Adam Ostrzycki, Marshall of the confederation army 1665–6
- Tadeusz Pełczyński, chief of staff of the Home Army (ZWZ / AK) (1941–1944)
- Józef Piłsudski, statesman, interwar Marshal of Poland
- Emilia Plater, countess, heroine of the November 1830 Uprising
- Józef Poniatowski, prince, Polish general and marshal of France
- Kazimierz Pułaski (Casimir Pulaski), Polish and American military commander
- Konstantin Rokossovsky, Marshal of the Soviet Union during WWII
- Stefan Rowecki, general, military commander, commander-in-chief of the Armed Resistance (ZWZ) (1940–1942) and Home Army (1942–1943)
- Tadeusz Jordan-Rozwadowski, general, Chief of Staff during the Battle of Warsaw
- Edward Rydz-Śmigły, marshal, military commander, successful in the Polish-Soviet War, C-in-C of the Polish Army in the September 1939 Campaign
- Yitzhak Sadeh (born Isaac Landsberg; 1890–1952), a founder of the Israel Defense Forces
- Danuta Siedzikówna (1928–1946), medical orderly in Polish Army
- Władysław Sikorski, general, commander-in-chief of the Polish Armed Forces and Prime Minister of Poland (1939–1943)
- Felicjan Sławoj Składkowski (1885–1962), general, physician and 28th Prime Minister of Poland (1936–1939)
- Piotr Skuratowicz, general of the Polish Army, was murdered by the NKVD in the Katyn massacre
- Stanisław Sosabowski, commander of the Polish 1st Independent Parachute Brigade, which saw action at the Battle of Arnhem during Operation Market Garden (1944)
- Kazimierz Sosnkowski, general, Commander-in-Chief of Polish Armed Forces (1943–1944)
- Adam Sowa, former deputy chief executive of the European Defence Agency
- Józef Sowiński, general, hero of the November uprising (1830–1831)
- Zygmunt Szendzielarz ("Łupaszko")
- Ignacy Szymanski, veteran of November 1830 Uprising and American Civil War (on the Confederate side)
- Jerzy Świrski (1882–1959), vice admiral in the Polish navy under British command during World War II
- Jan Tarnowski, Grand Crown Hetman (1527–1561), victor of Obertyn (1531)
- Jozef Unrug (1884–1973), German-born vice-admiral in Polish navy, imprisoned in Colditz Castle during WWII
- Maria Wittek (1899–1997), brigadier general, head of Women's Auxiliary Military Service (1928–1949)
- Wojtek (1942–1963), a Persian bear, adopted during World War II by soldiers of the 2nd Polish Corps
- Stefania Wojtulanis-Karpińska (1912–2005), Captain in the Polish Air Force, pilot in Air Transport Auxiliary during Second World War, was known as Barbara Wojtulanis
- Piotr Wysocki, led the November Uprising (1830)
- Aleksandra Zagórska, lieutenant colonel, independence activist and organiser of women's military squads (1917–1921)
- Kordian Józef Zamorski, general; chief of the Polish state police (1935–1939)
- Jan Zamoyski, Great Chancellor of Poland (1578–1605) and Grand Crown Hetman (1581–1605)
- Władysław Stanisław Zamoyski, general in the Crimean War, diplomat (1803–1868)
- Elżbieta Zawacka, general; the only woman among the Silent Unseen
- Stanisław Żółkiewski, chancellor of Poland, military commander, conqueror of Moscow (1610), Grand Crown Hetman (1613–1620)
- Janusz Żurakowski, World War II fighter pilot and Avro Arrow test pilot
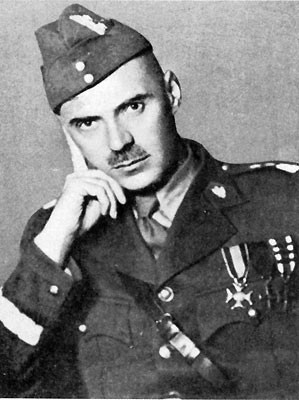
Anders

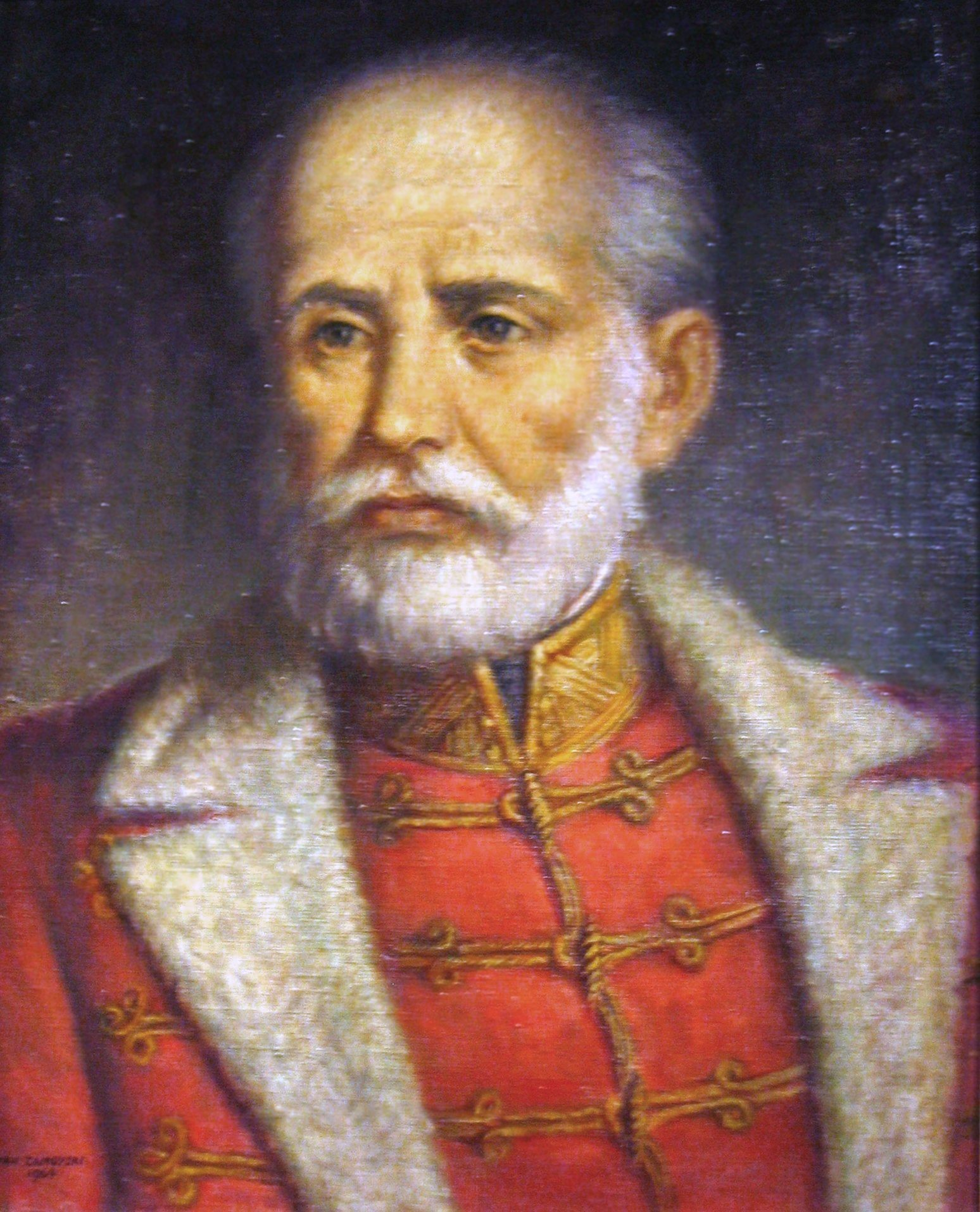
Bem

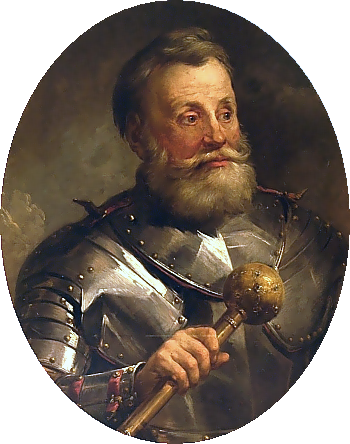
Chodkiewicz

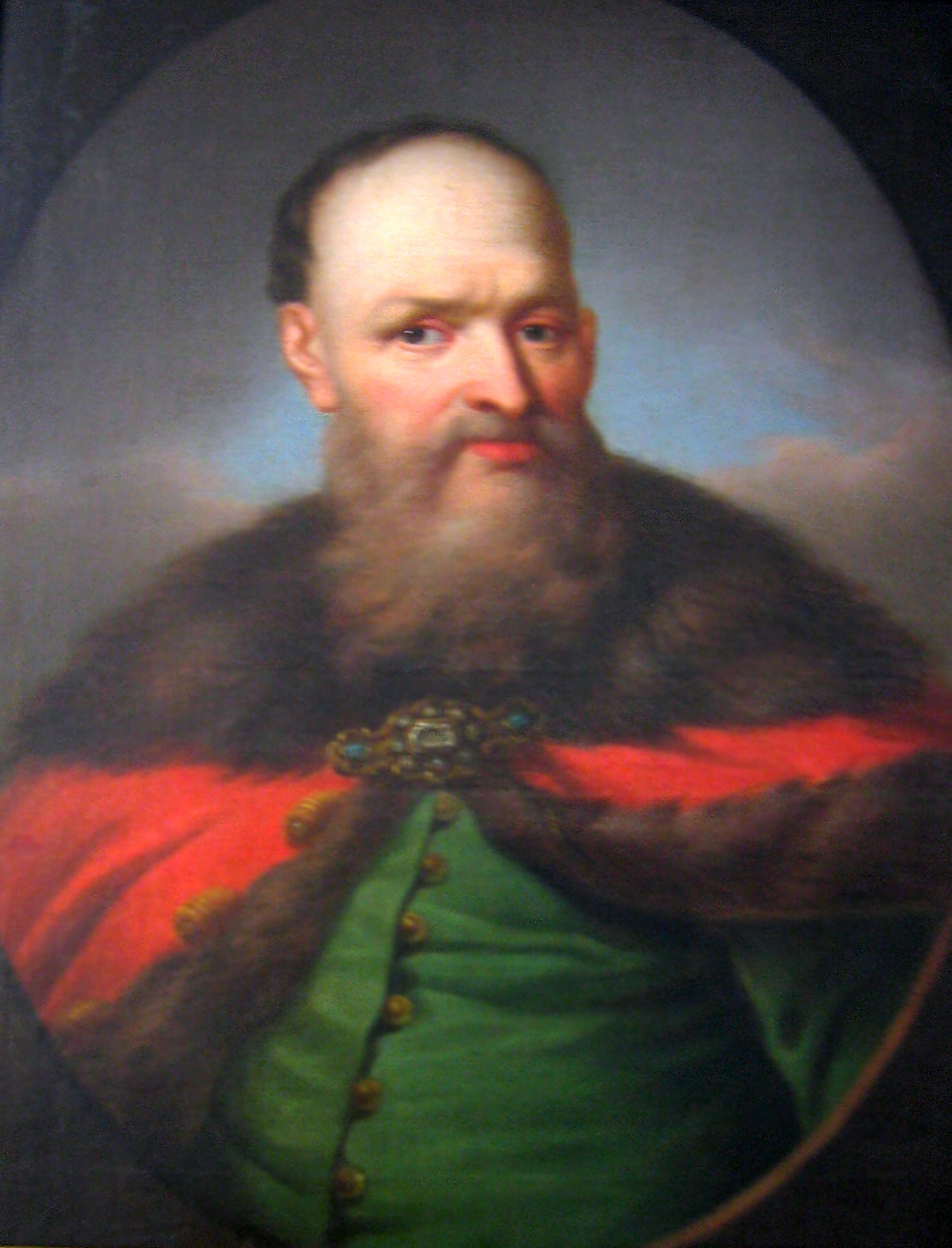
Czarniecki

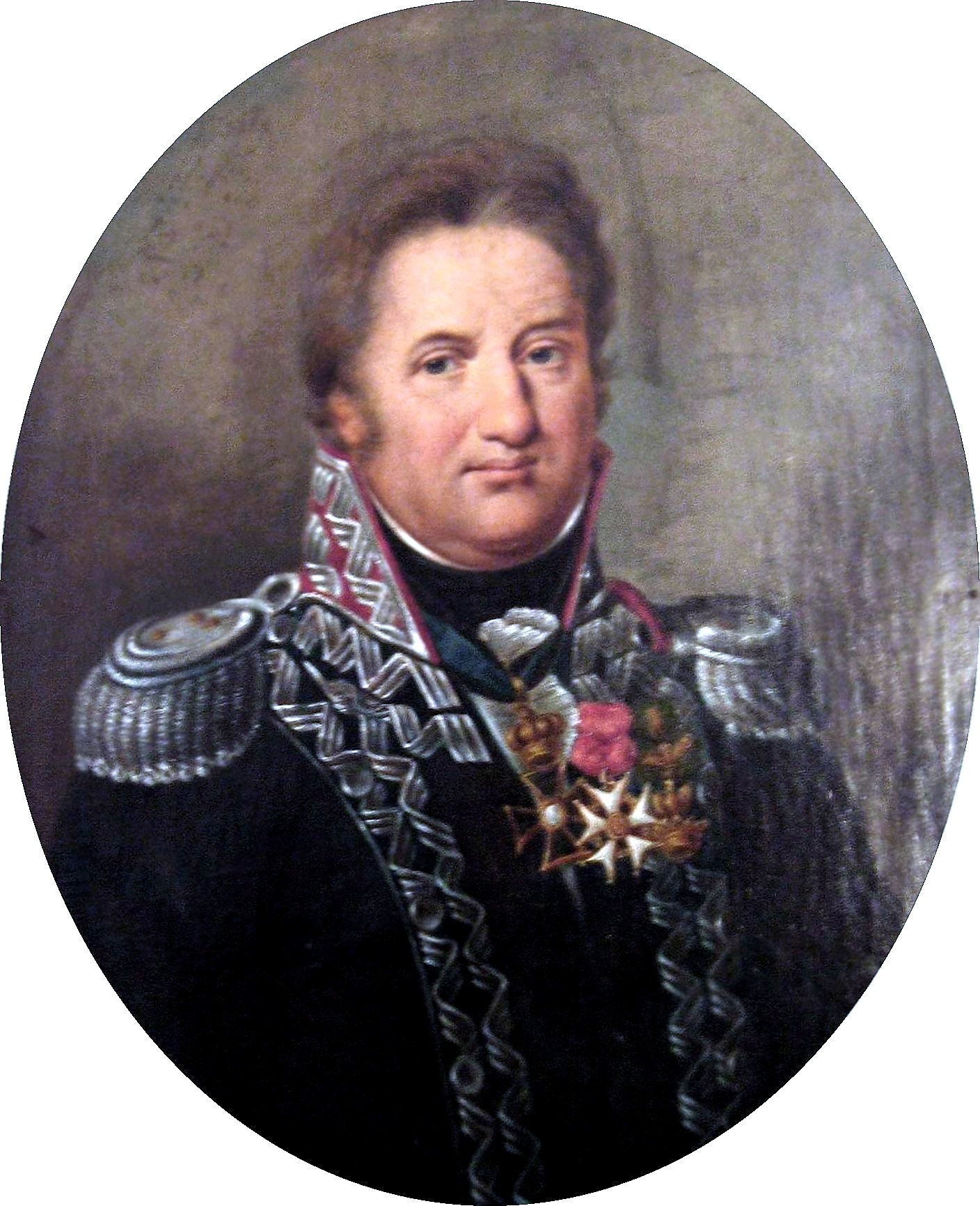
Jan Dąbrowski

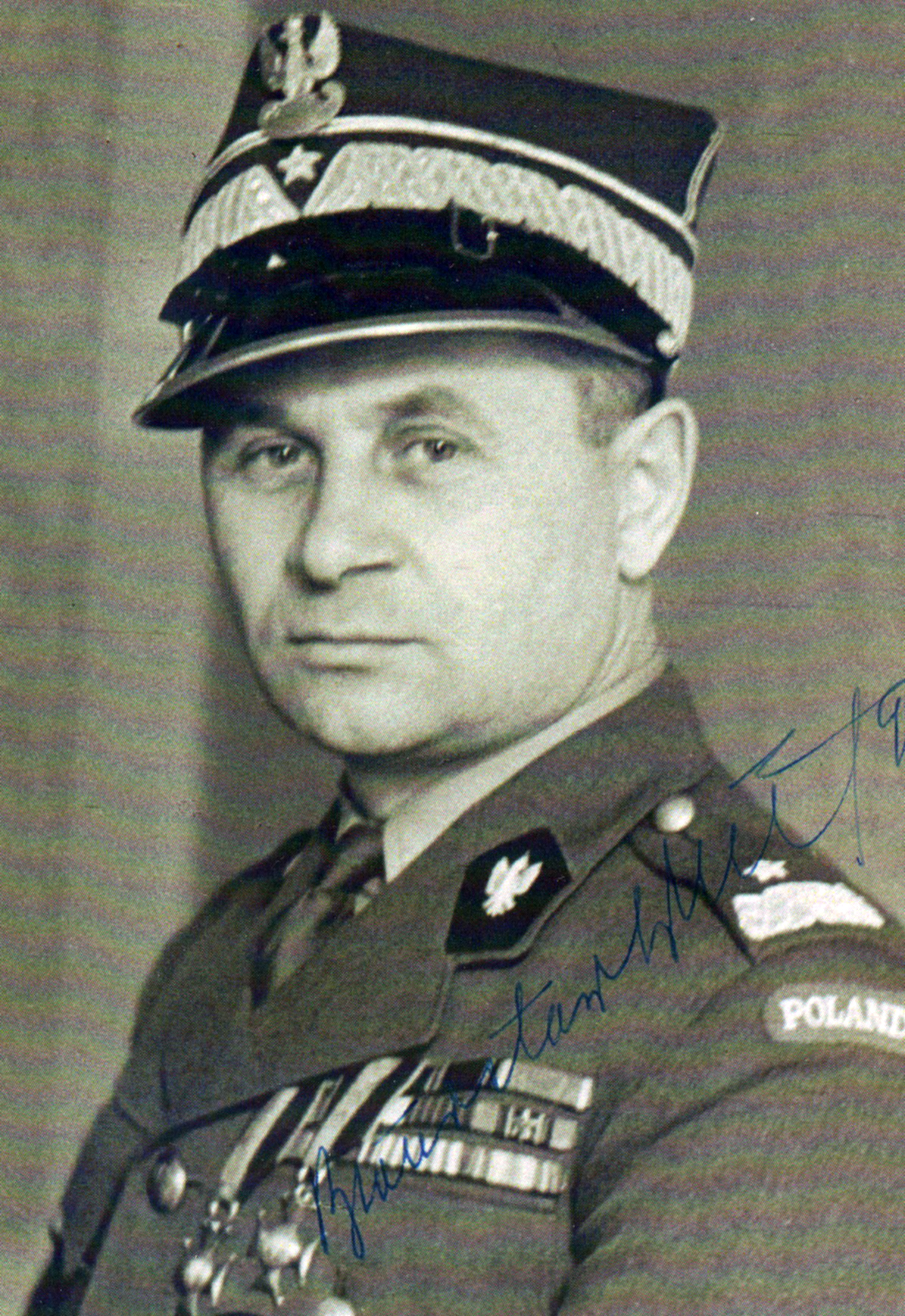
Duch

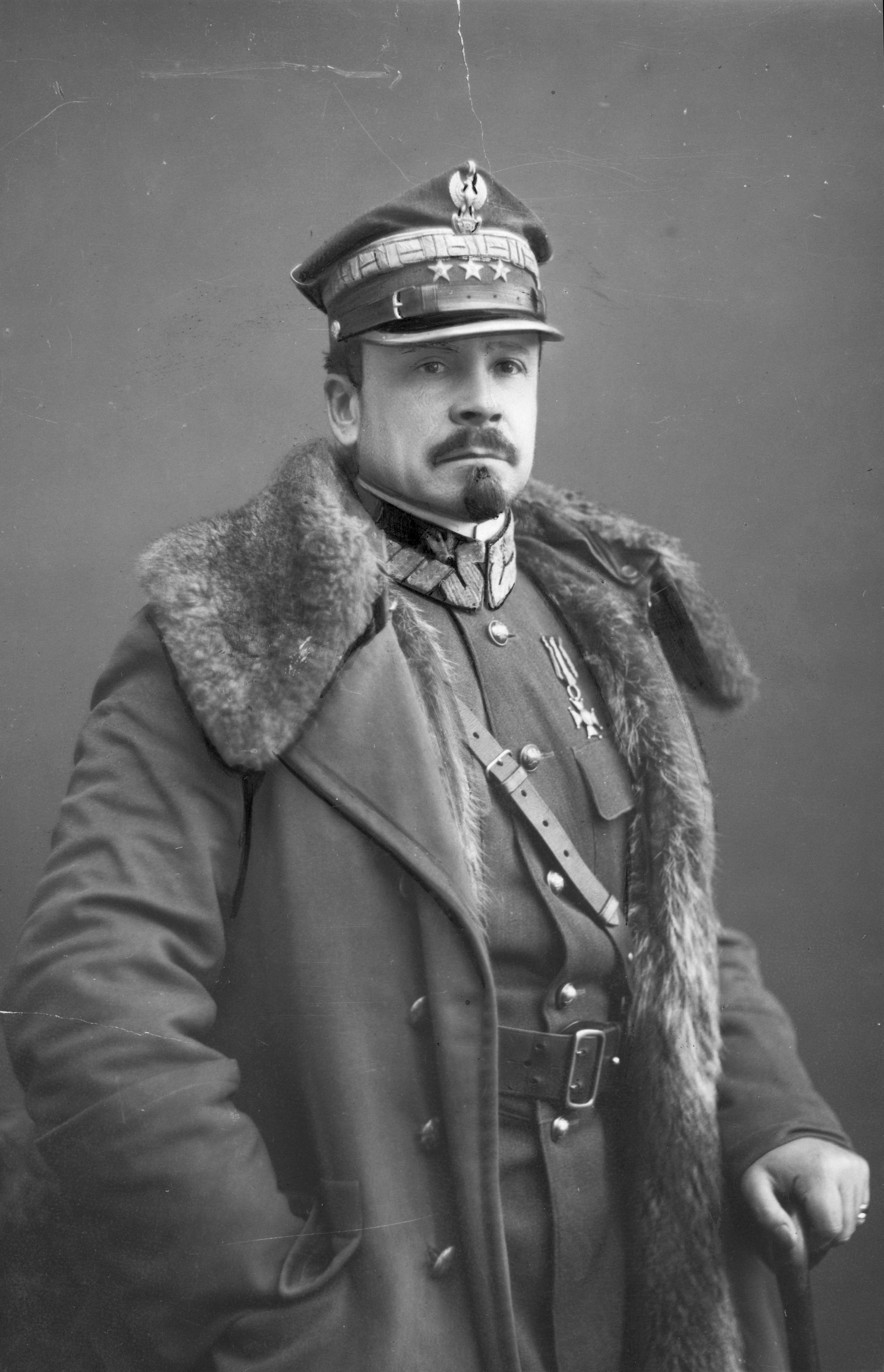
Haller

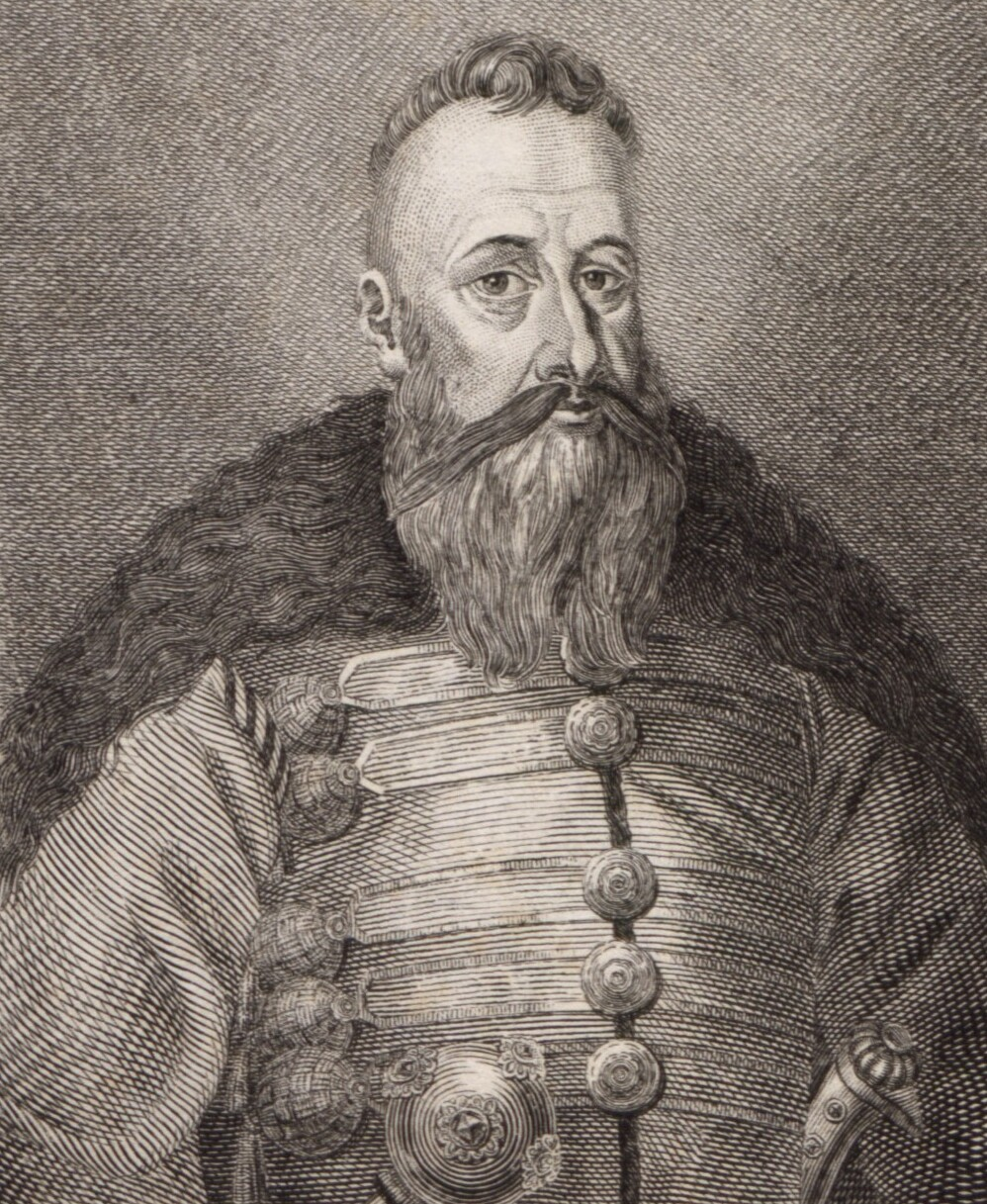
Koniecpolski

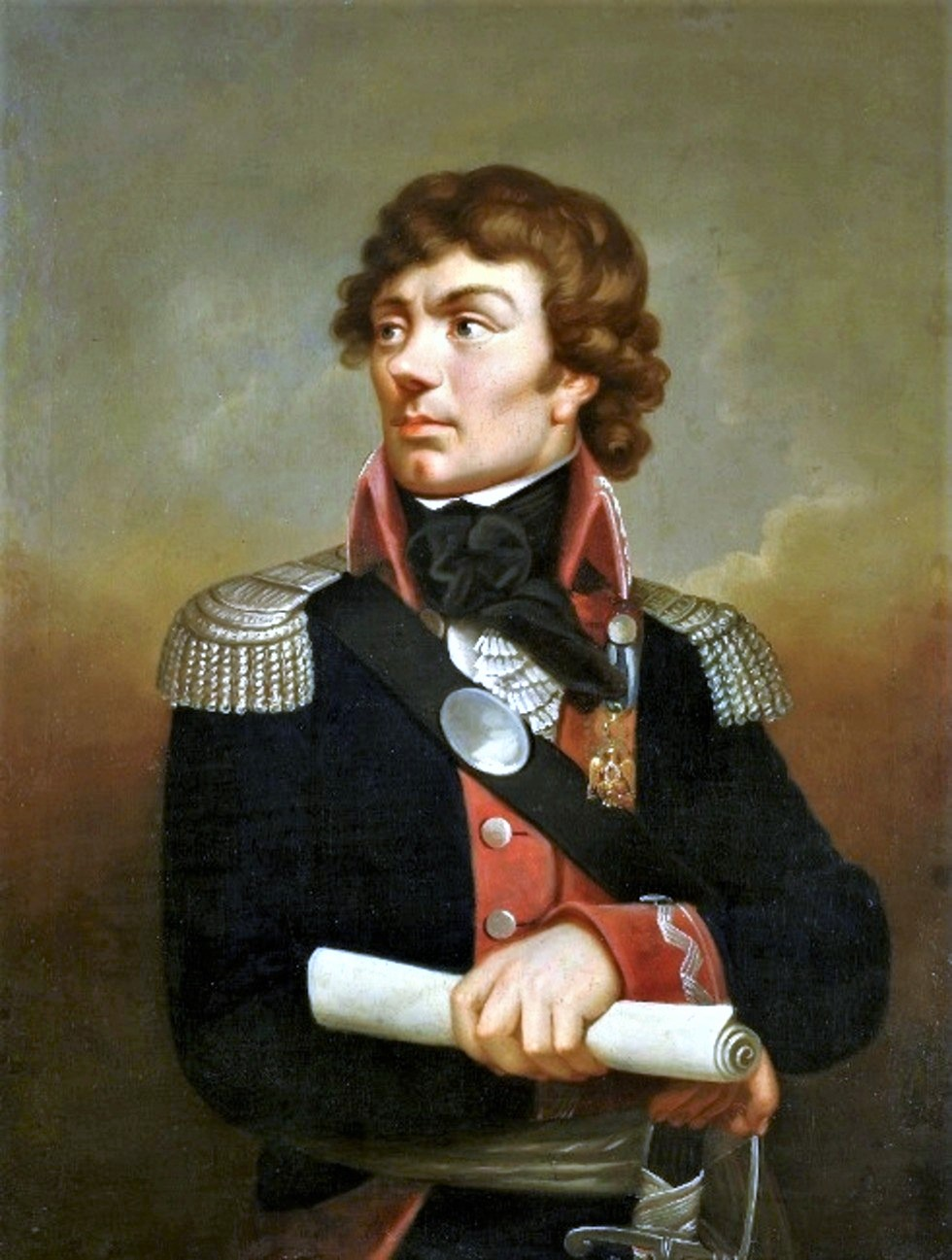
Kościuszko

Krzyżanowski

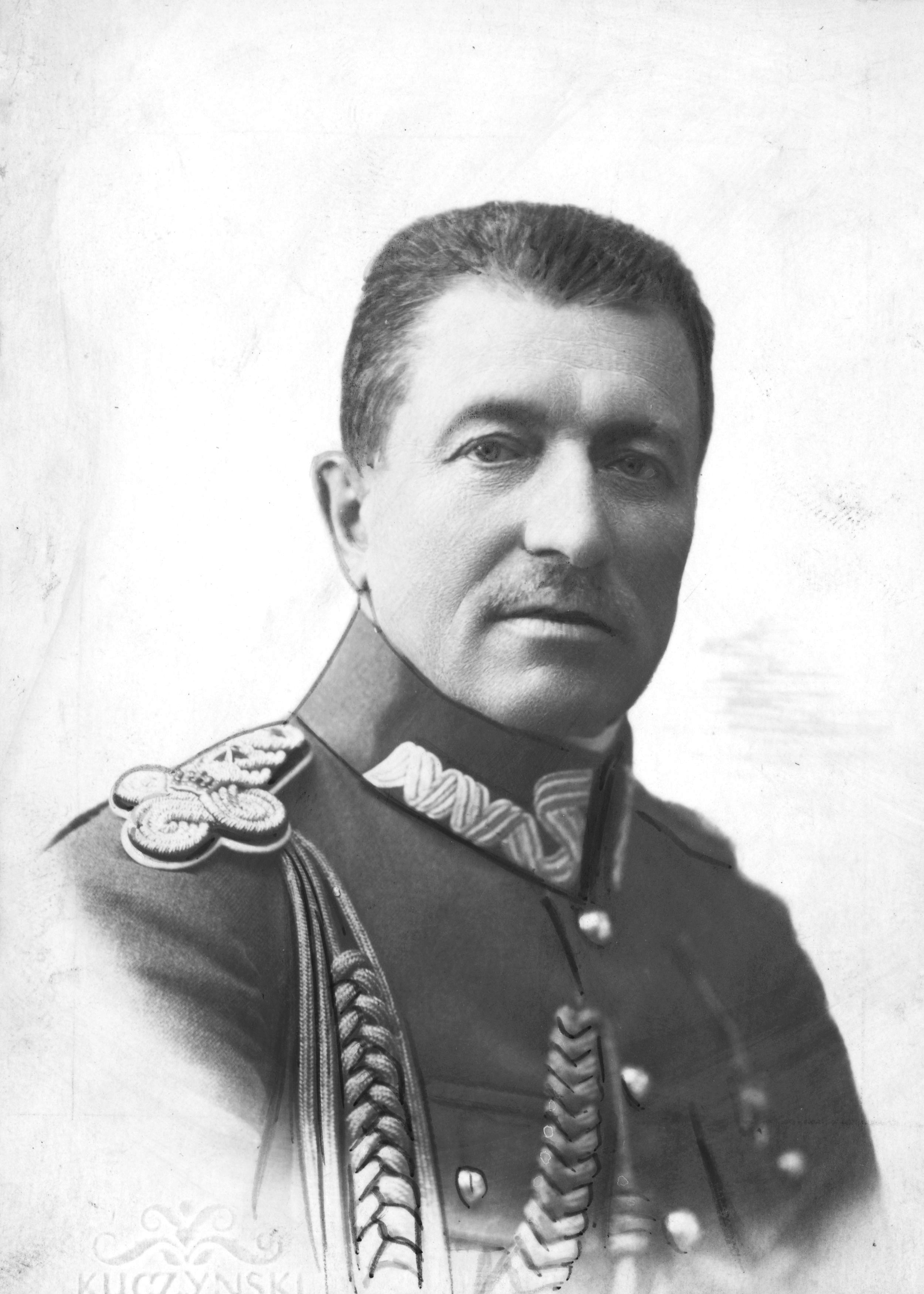
Latinik

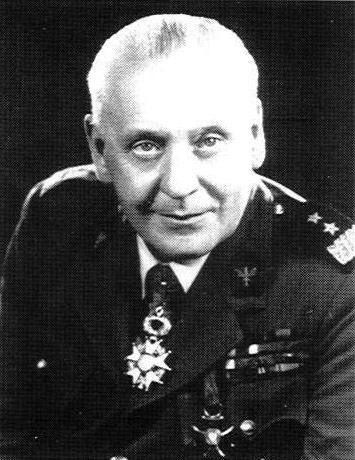
Maczek

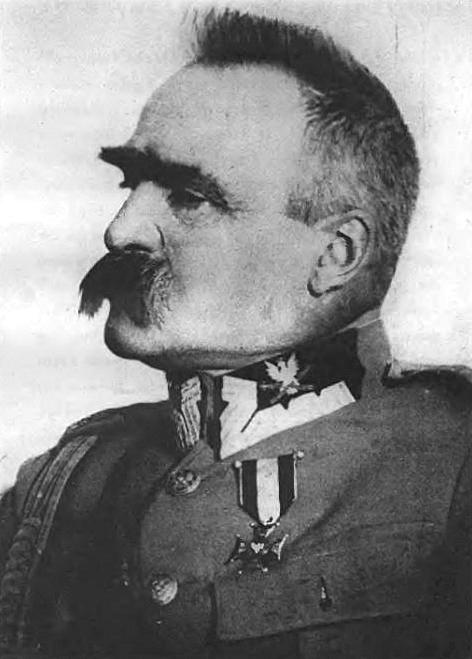
Piłsudski

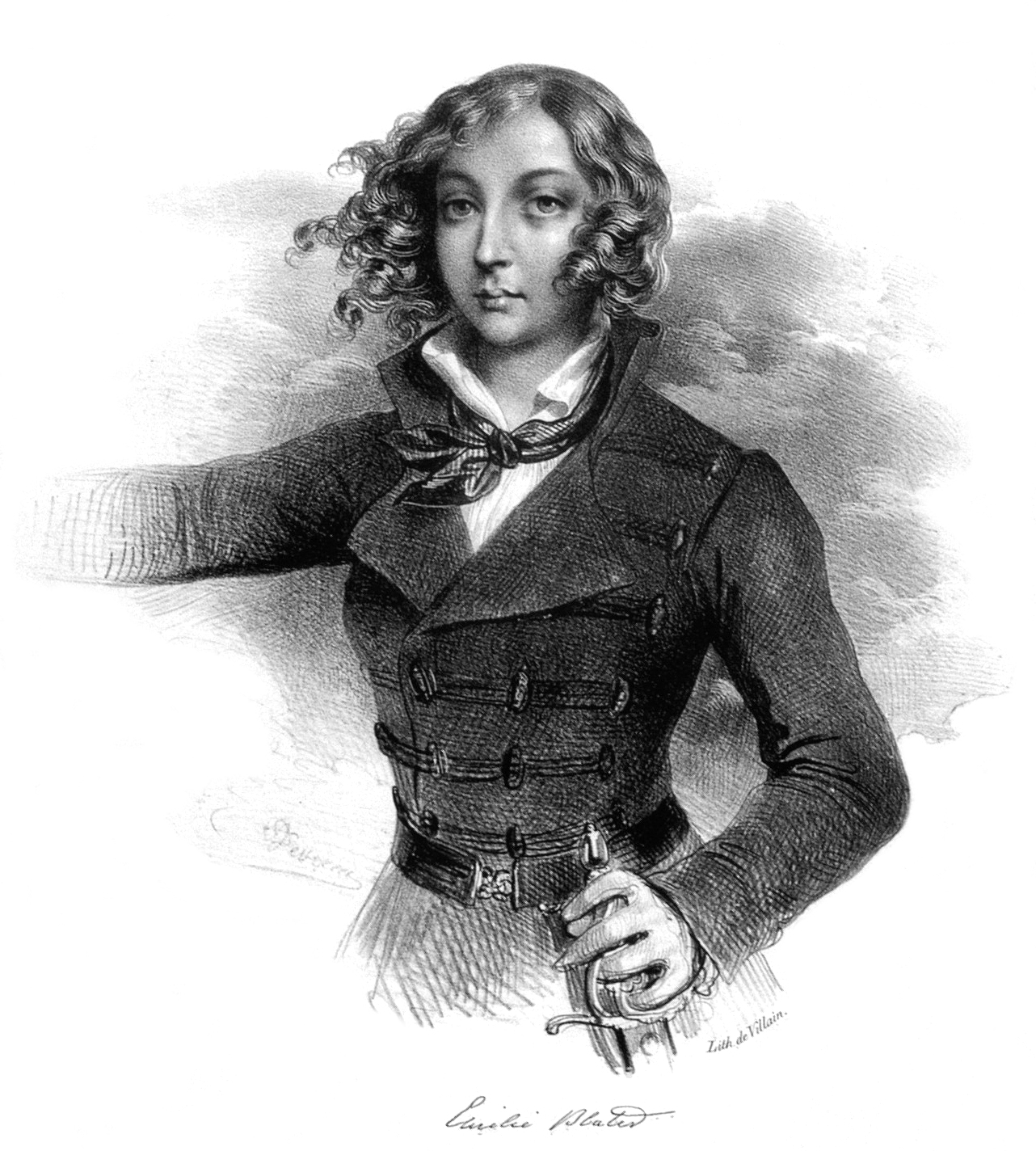
Plater

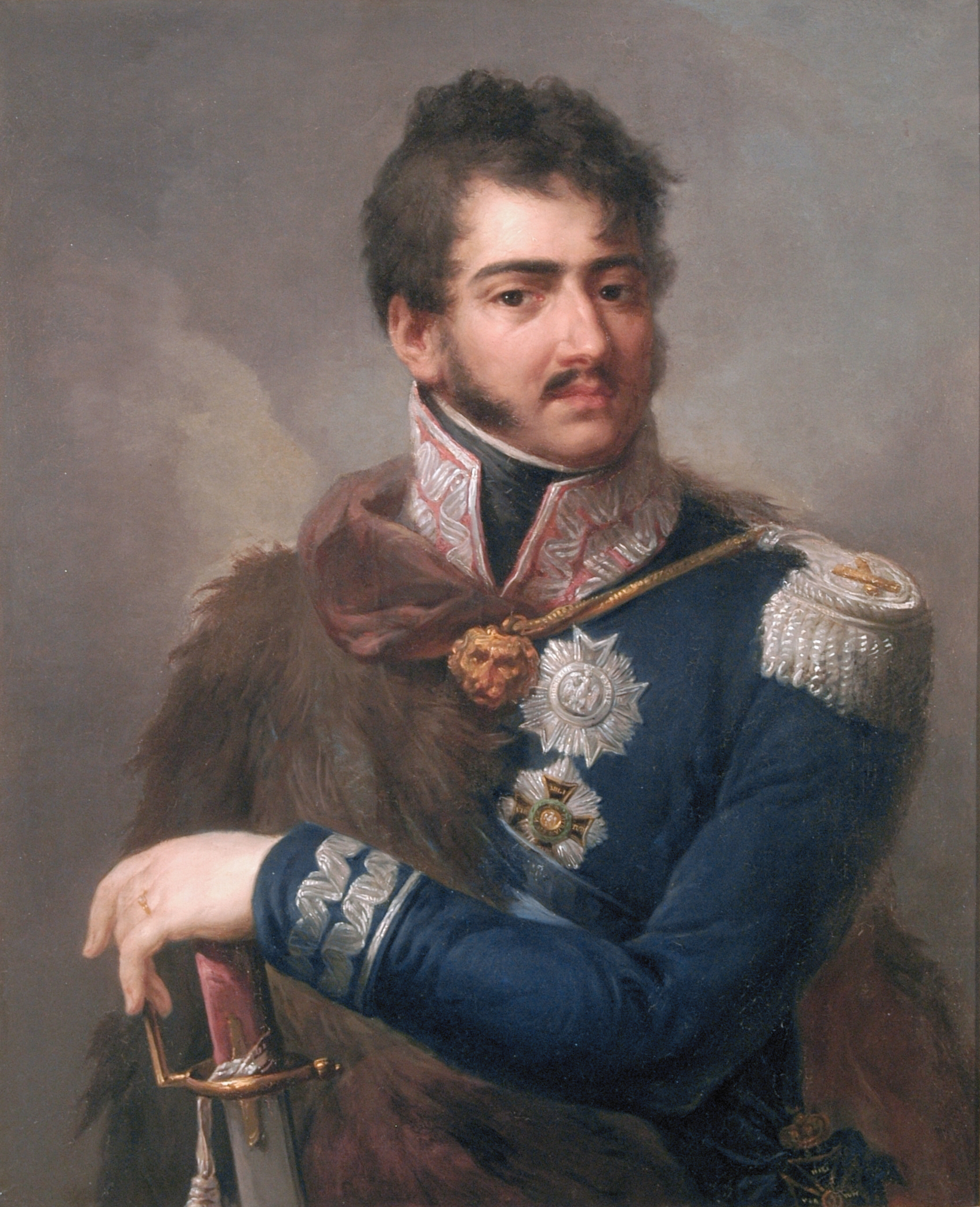
Poniatowski

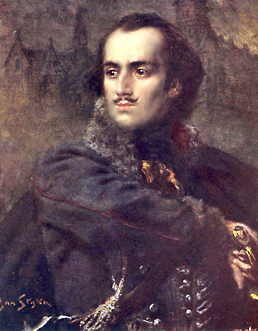
Pułaski

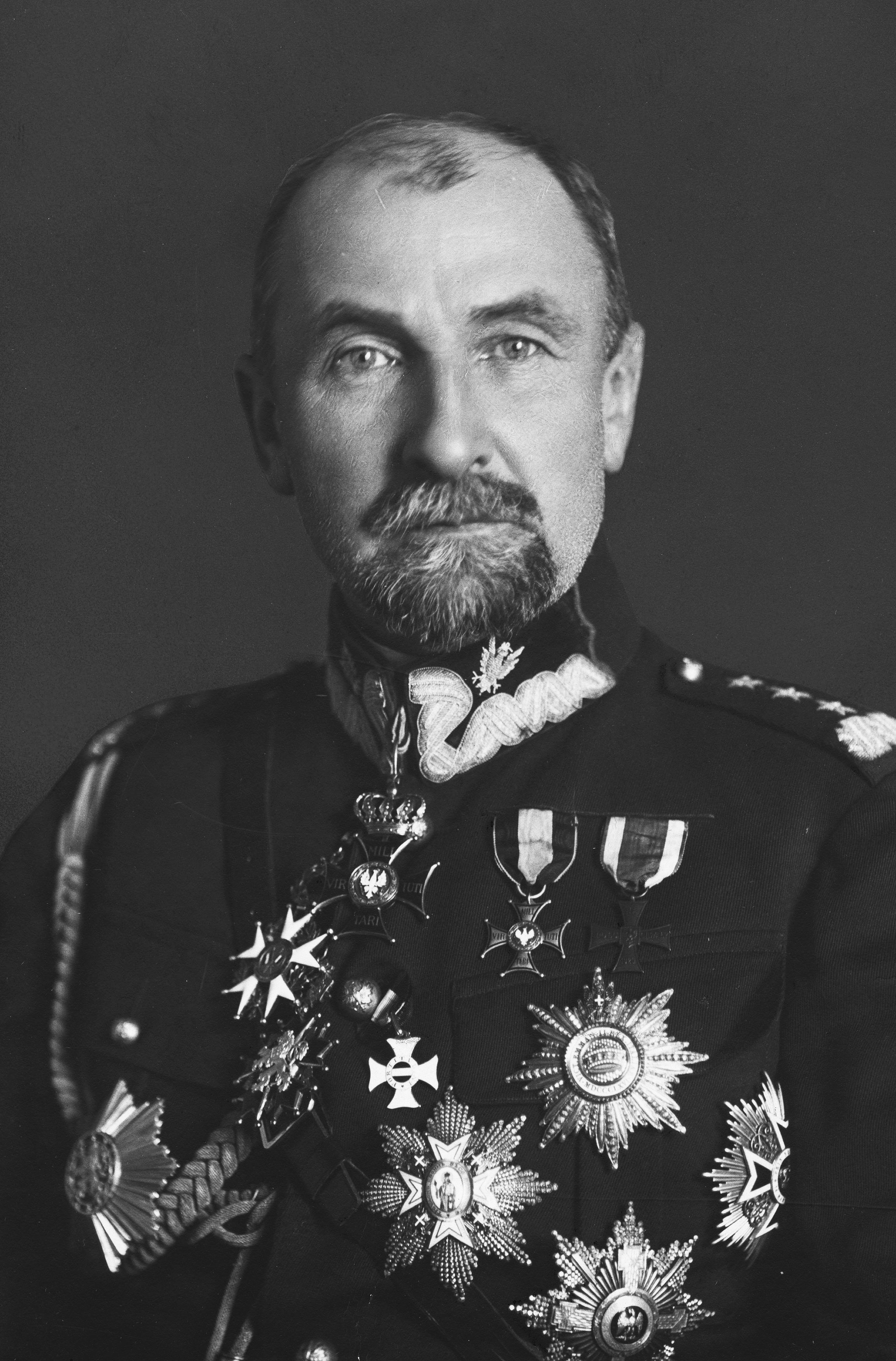
Rozwadowski

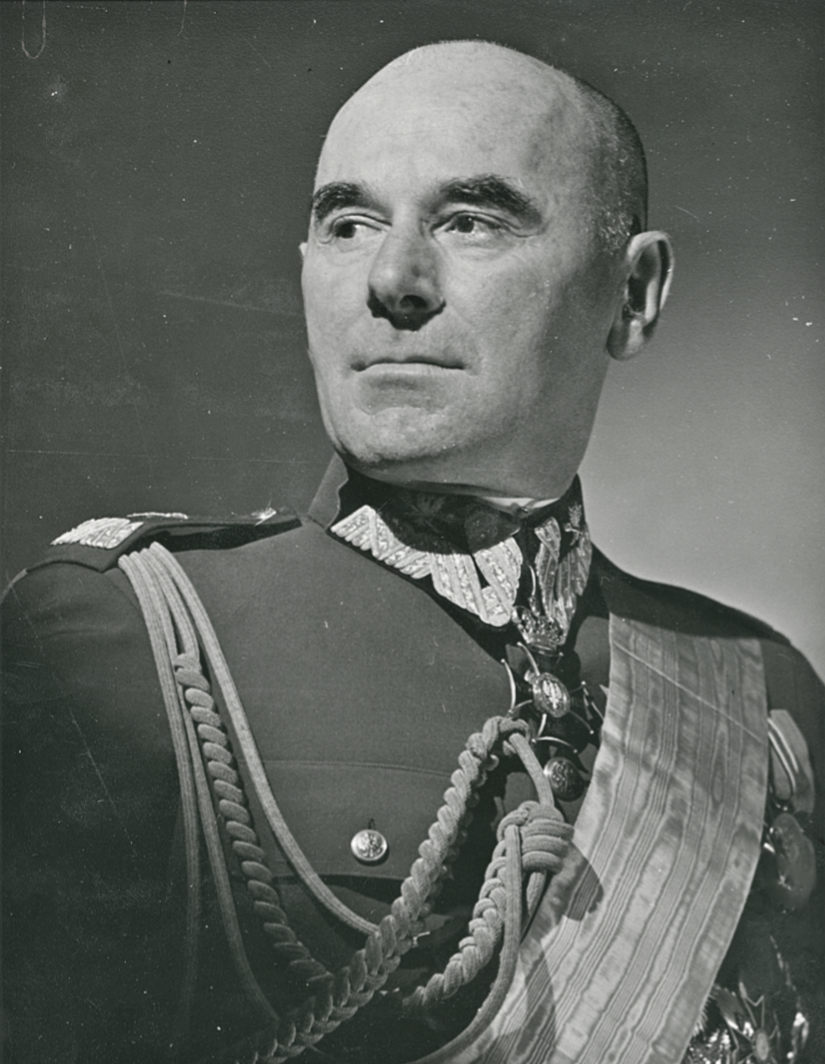
Rydz-Śmigły

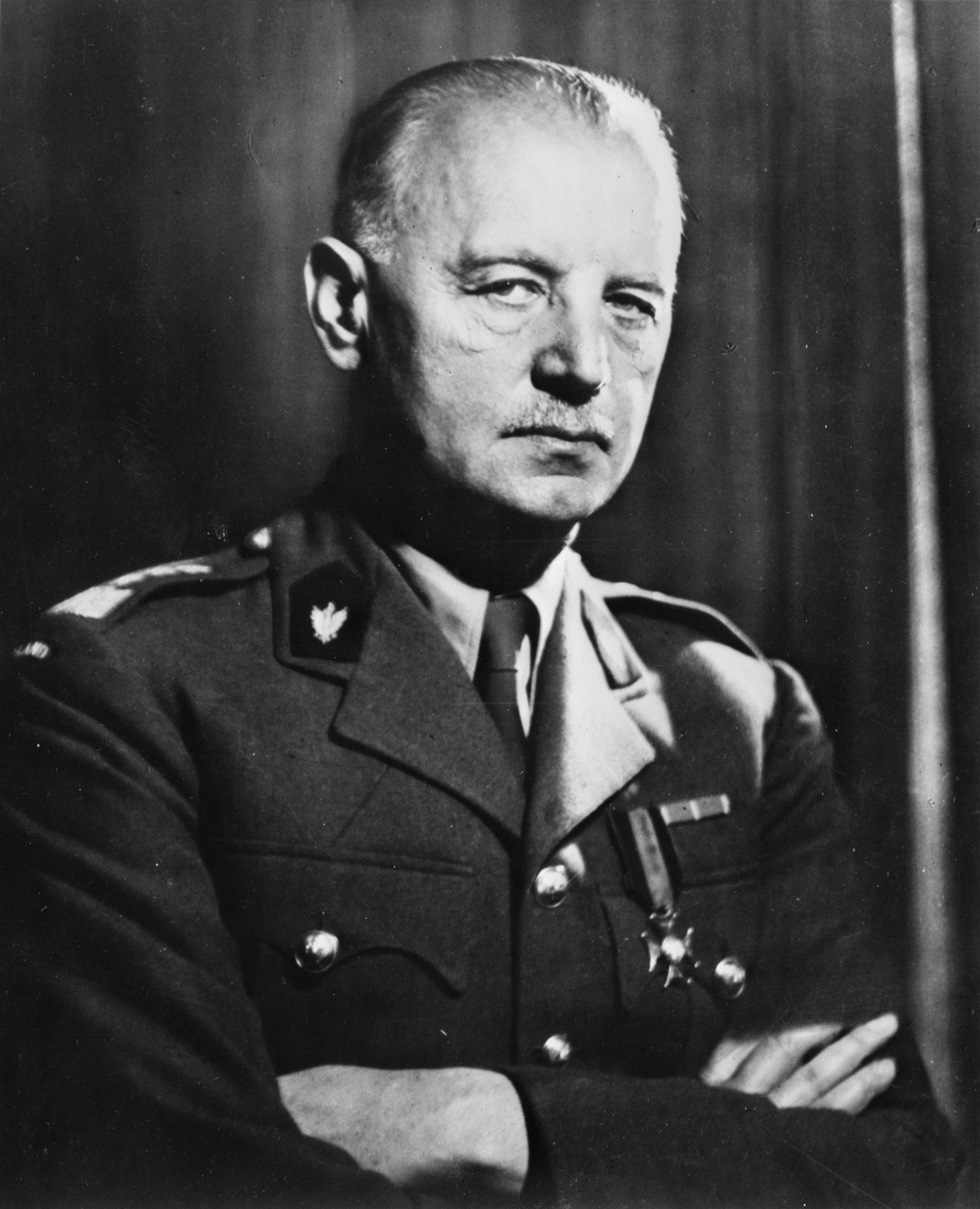
Sikorski

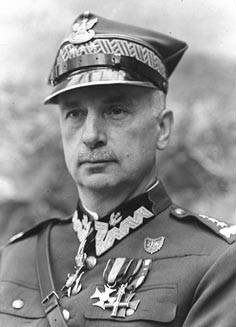
Sosnkowski

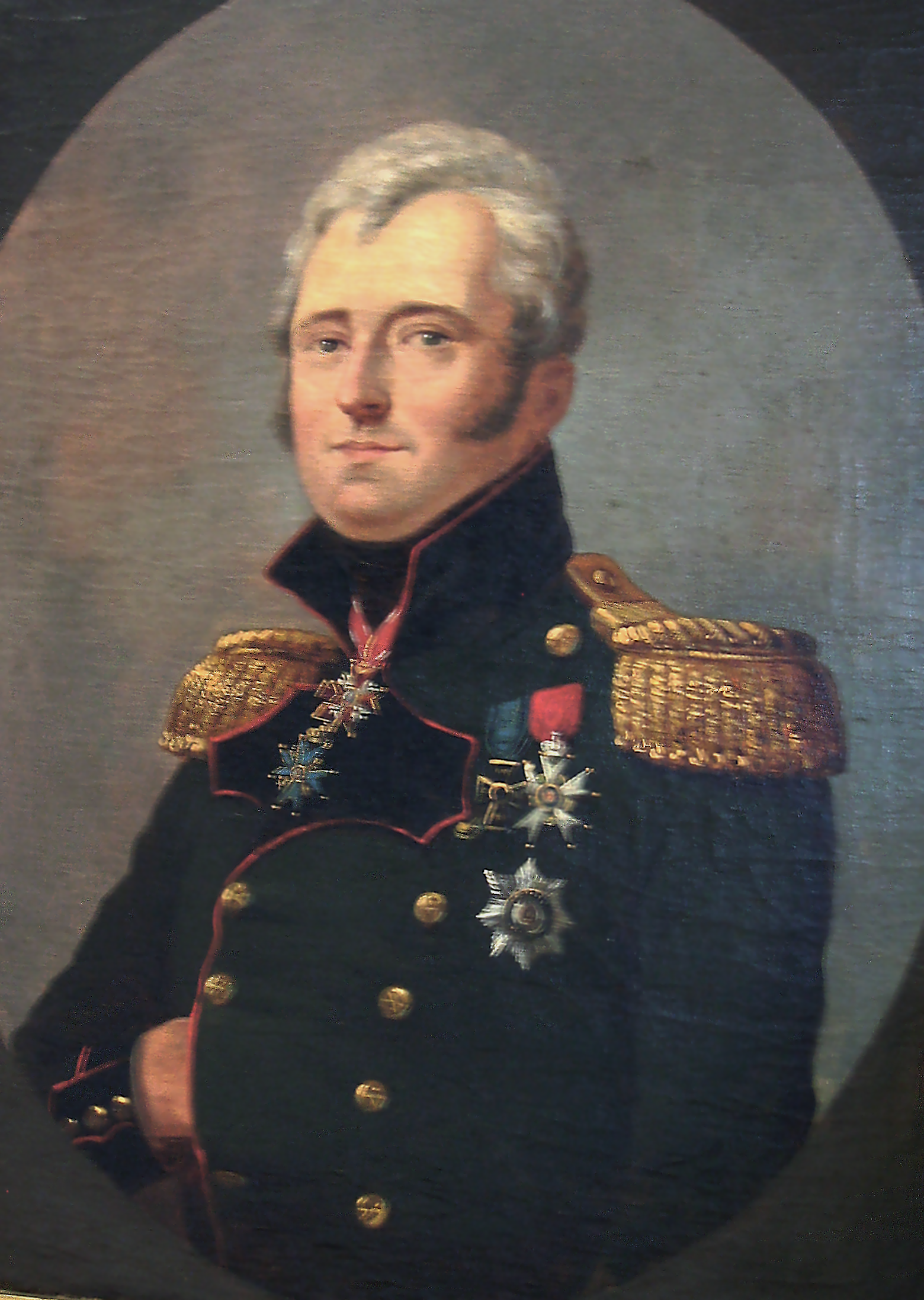
Sowiński

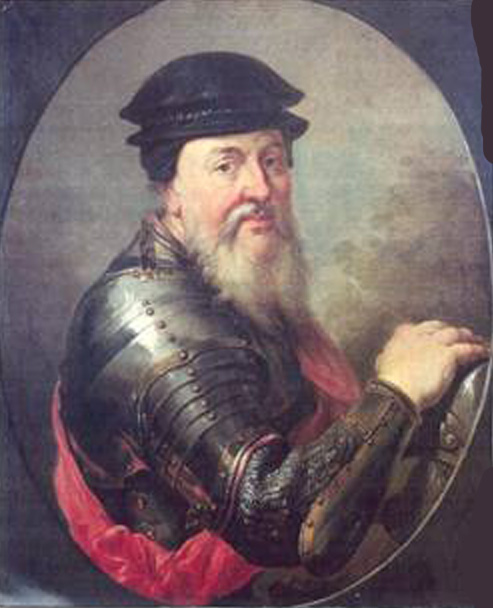
Tarnowski

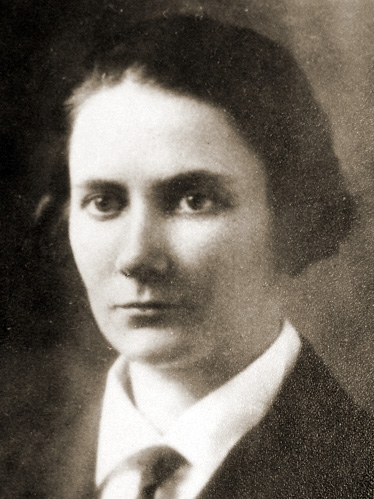
Wittek

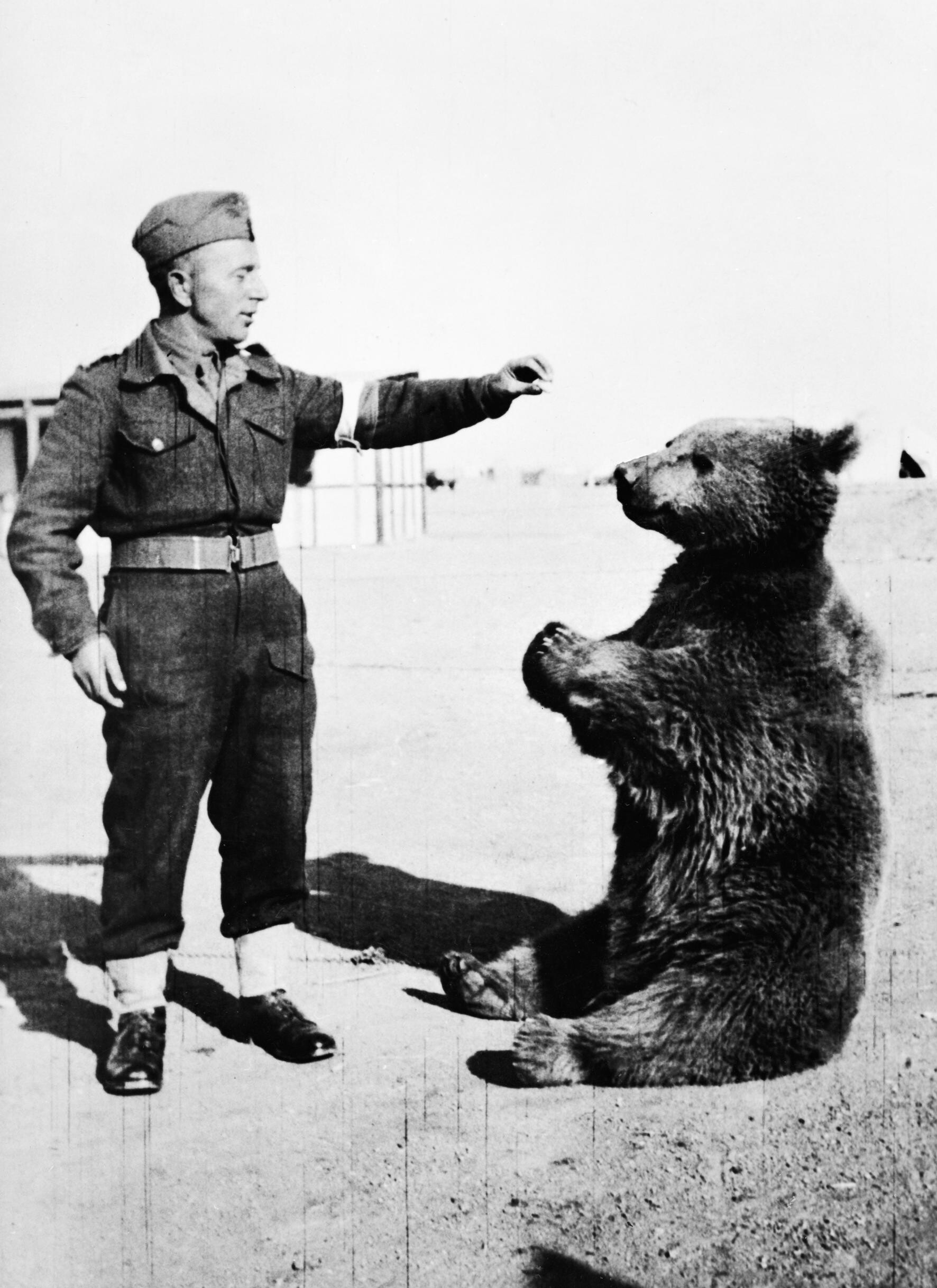
Wojtek (bear)

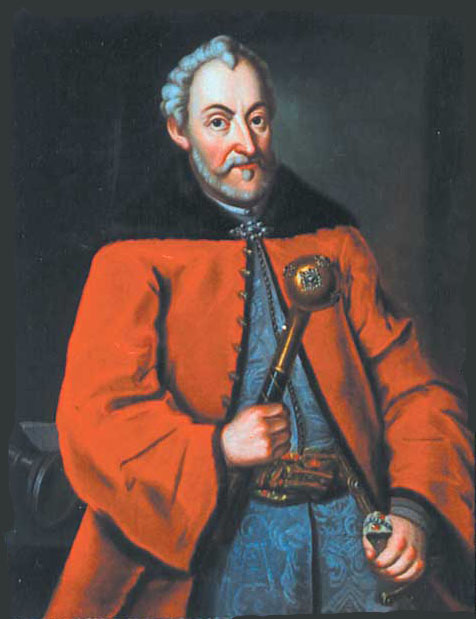
Zamoyski

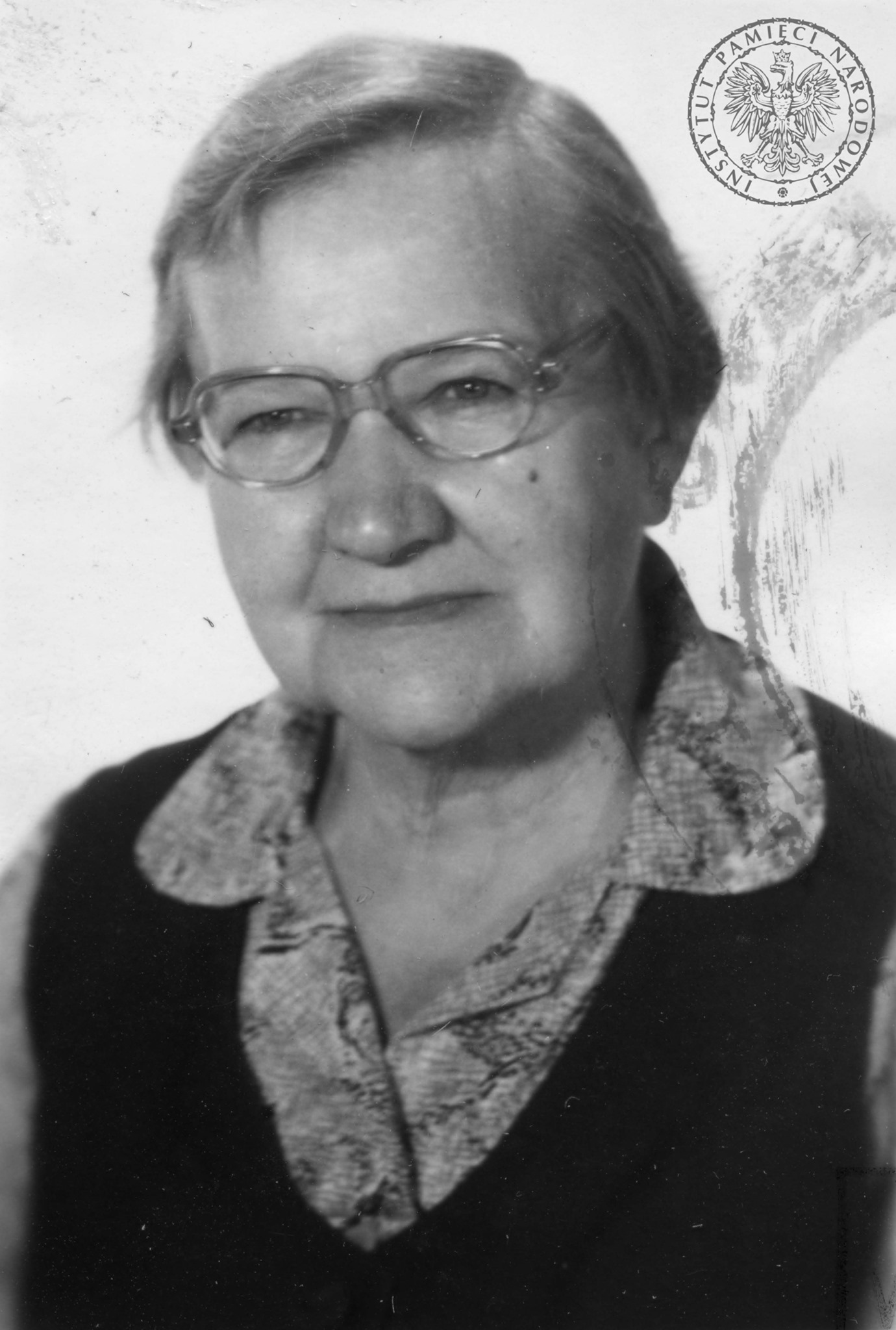
Zawacka

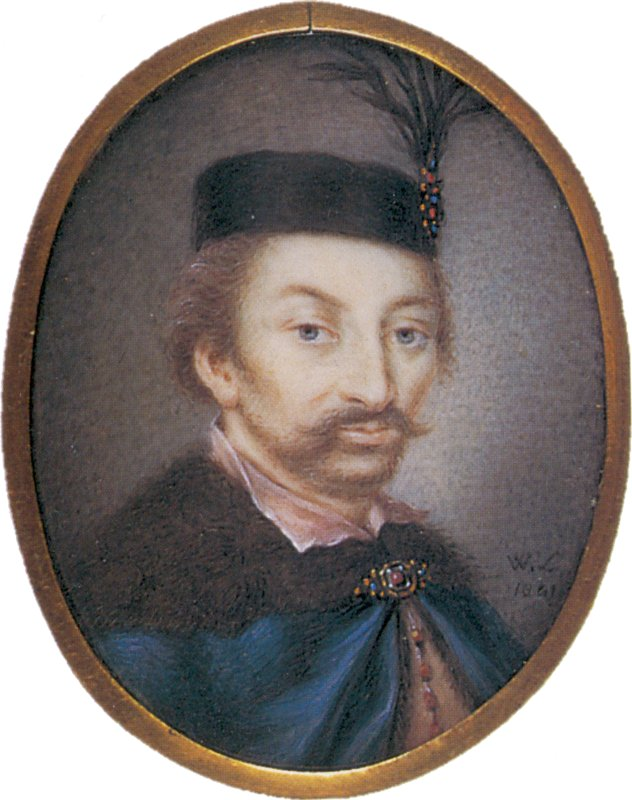
Żółkiewski

== Intelligence ==
- Feliks Ankerstein, interwar covert-operations officer and deputy to Edmund Charaszkiewicz in Office 2 of the General Staff's Section II (Intelligence)
- Edmund Charaszkiewicz, interwar covert-operations officer and coordinator of Józef Piłsudski's Promethean project to dismember the Soviet Union
- Maksymilian Ciężki, chief of the Polish Cipher Bureau's German section (BS–4), which from 1932 decrypted German Enigma ciphers, paving the way for Britain's World War II Ultra secret
- Roman Czerniawski, Polish Air Force captain and British Double Cross System agent
- Marian Drobik, Home Army (AK) colonel, chief of the General Staff's Section II (intelligence) (1942–1943)
- Wiktor Tomir Drymmer, close collaborator of Foreign Minister Józef Beck, and chief of the secret prewar K-7 organization that supervised certain Polish covert operations
- Józef Englicht, prewar deputy chief of the Polish General Staff's Section II
- Michael Goleniewski, Cold War Polish, Soviet, and American-CIA agent
- Jan Karski, emissary who confirmed the reality of the Holocaust to Western Allies
- Bolesław Kontrym, Polish agent, Red Army combrig, Polish Army major
- Jan Kowalewski, engineer, intelligence officer and cryptologist, one of many who broke Soviet ciphers during the Polish-Soviet War of 1919–1921
- Andrzej Kowerski, Polish Army officer and World War II British SOE agent; colleague of Krystyna Skarbek
- Ryszard Kukliński, Polish Army colonel, Cold War CIA master spy
- Jerzy Franciszek Kulczycki, Polish spy at the Battle of Vienna (1683); founder of Vienna's first coffee house, which offered coffee produced from coffee beans captured from the Turks
- Gwido Langer, head of Poland's Cipher Bureau, which from 1932 broke Germany's military Enigma ciphers
- Kazimierz Leski, engineer, fighter pilot, World War II "Musketeers" and Home Army intelligence officer
- Stefan Mayer, prewar Section II intelligence officer who supervised the General Staff's Cipher Bureau
- Jerzy Pawłowski, Olympic gold-medalist fencer and Cold-War double agent
- Tadeusz Pełczyński, general, chief of the General Staff's Section II (1929–1932; 1935–January 1938)
- Sergiusz Piasecki, Polish agent, covering the area of Soviet Belarus (1922–1926)
- Marcel Reich-Ranicki, Polish consul-general and intelligence agent in London (1948–1949); the most influential contemporary critic of German literature
- Tadeusz Schaetzel, intelligence officer, chief of the General Staff's Section II (1926–1929)
- Krystyna Skarbek, aka Christine Granville, World War II British SOE agent
- Mieczysław Zygfryd Słowikowski (Rygor-Słowikowski), Polish Army intelligence officer whose work in North Africa facilitated Allied preparations for the 1942 Operation Torch landings
- Jerzy Sosnowski, major, Polish spy in Germany (1926–1934) as Georg von Sosnowski, Ritter von Nalecz
- Antoni Szymański, Polish military attaché in Berlin (1932–1939)
- Halina Szymańska, World War II British intelligence agent; wife of Antoni Szymański
- Jan Włodarkiewicz, lieutenant colonel, the first commander of Wachlarz
- Marian Zacharski, Cold-War Polish intelligence agent convicted of espionage against the United States
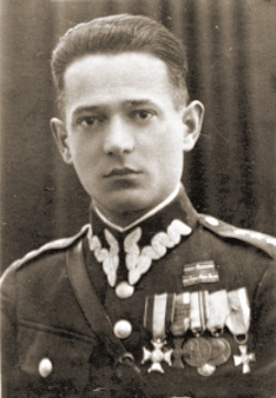
Ankerstein

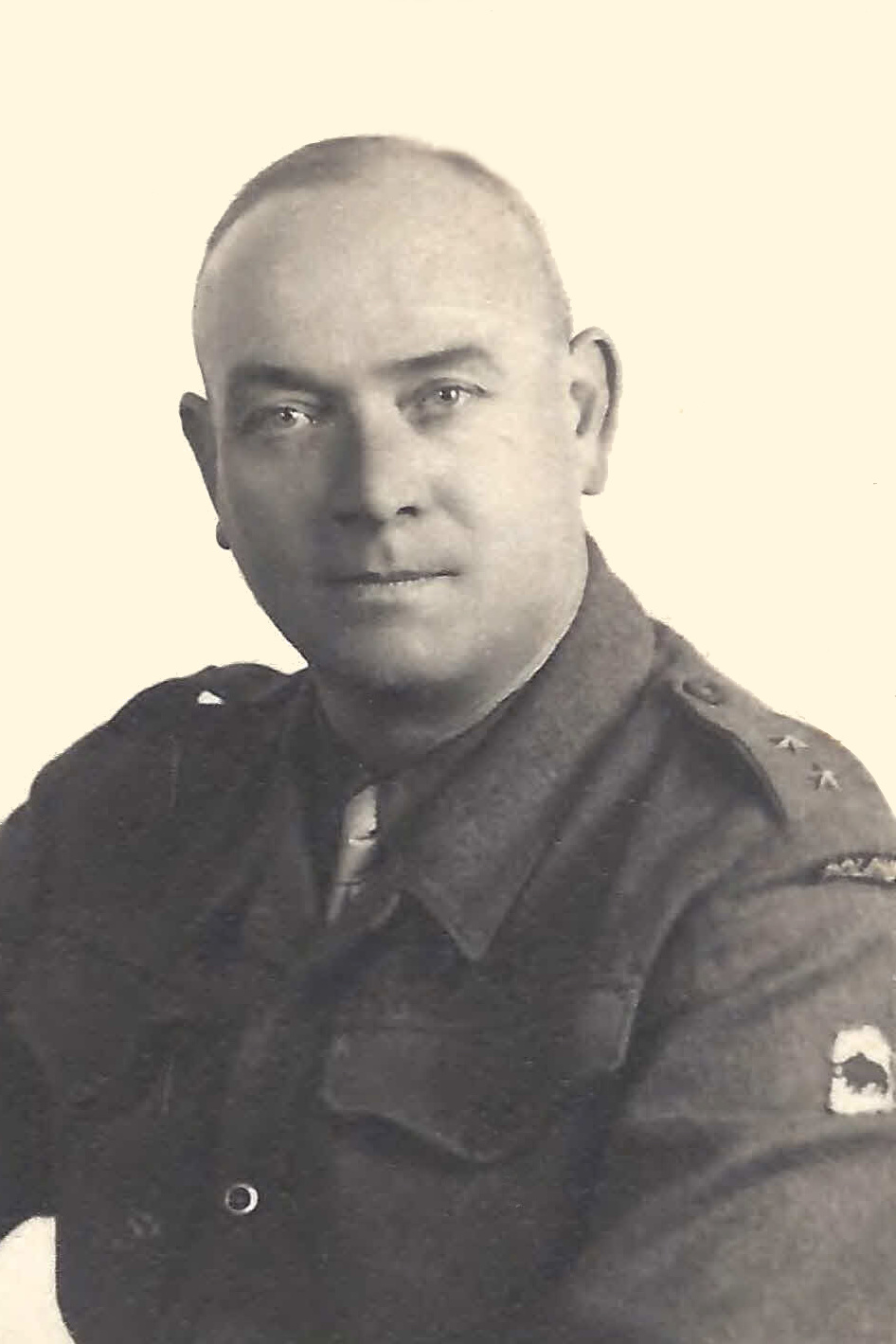
Grodyński

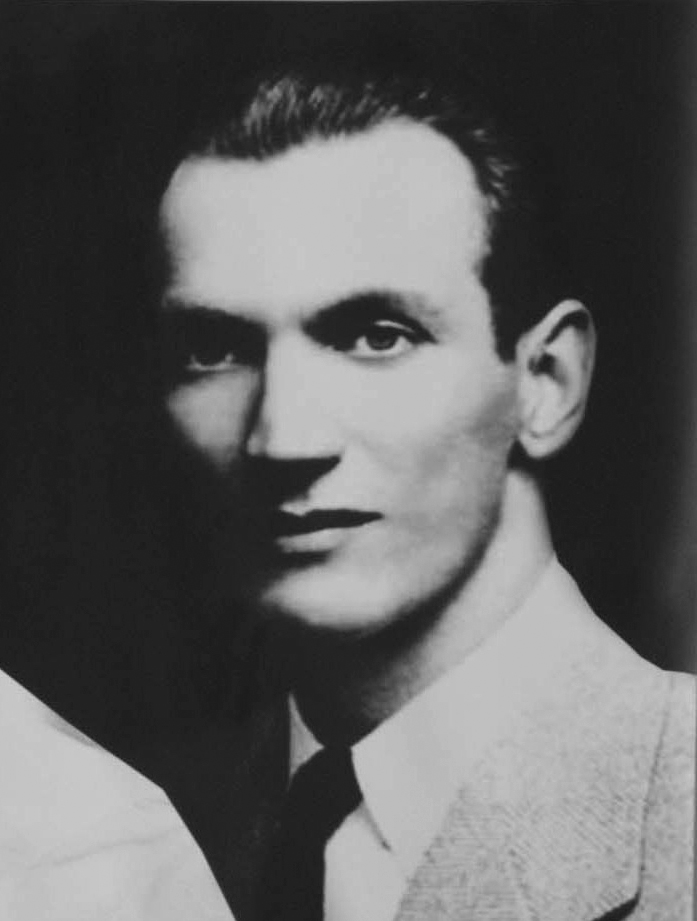
Karski

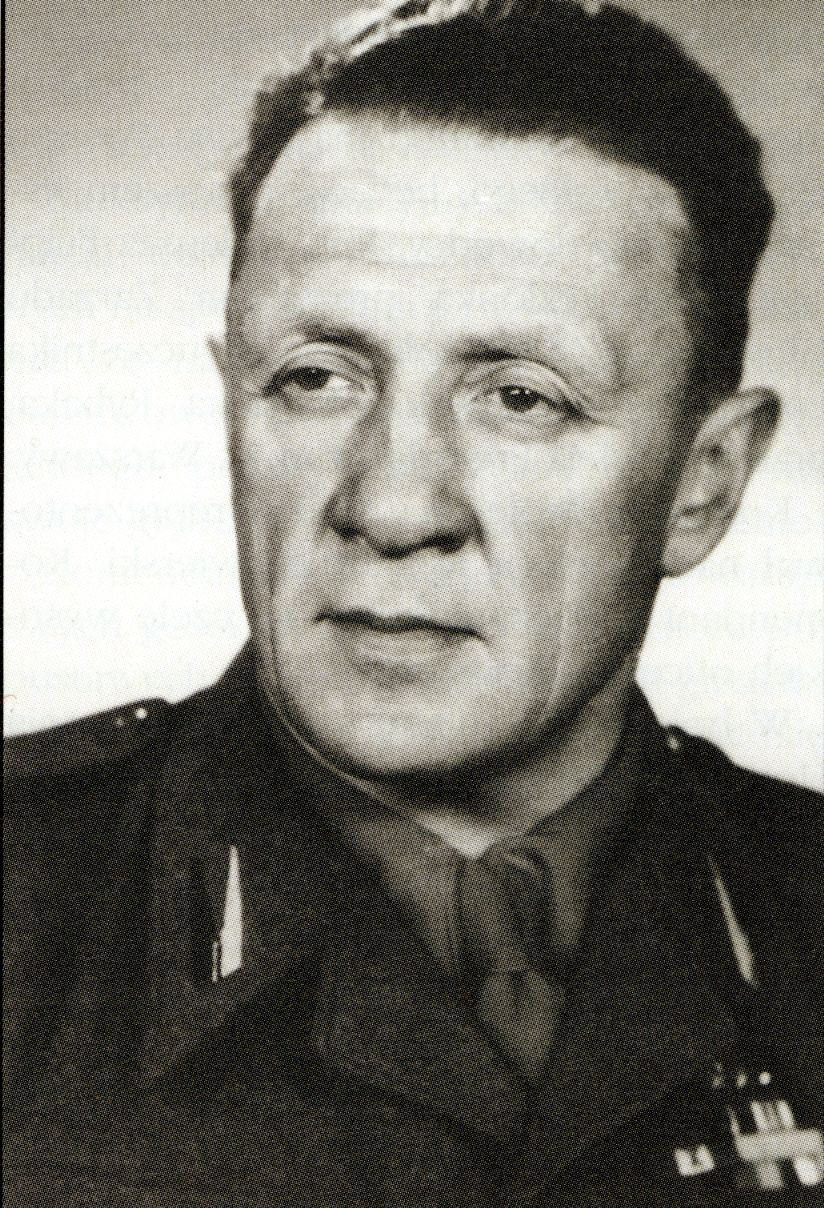
Kontrym

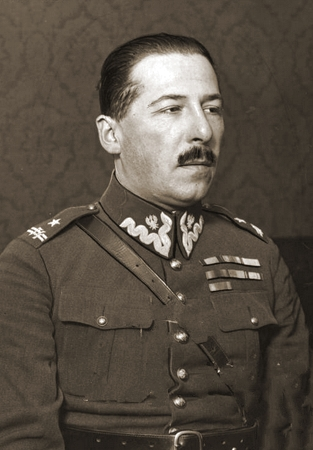
Kowalewski

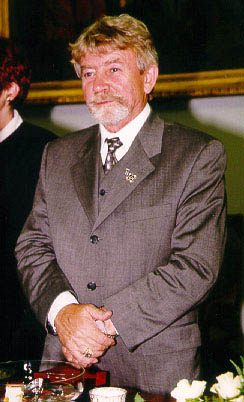
Kukliński

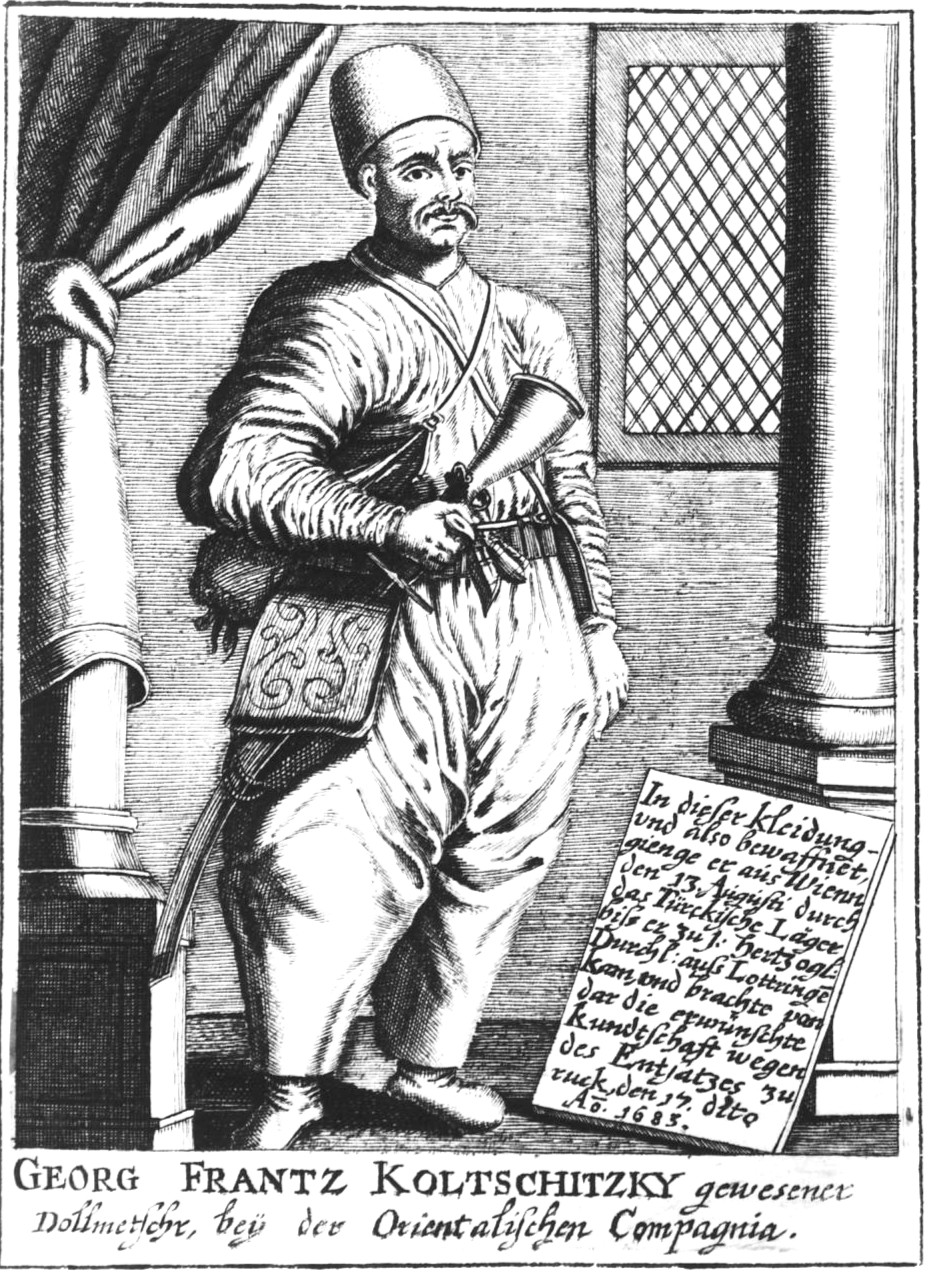
Kulczycki

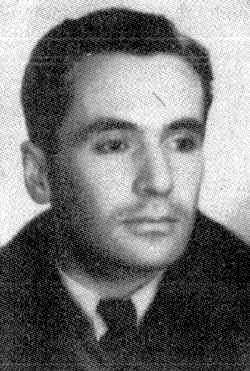
Leski

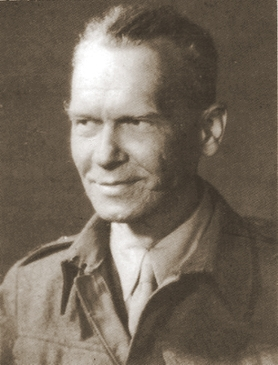
Pełczyński

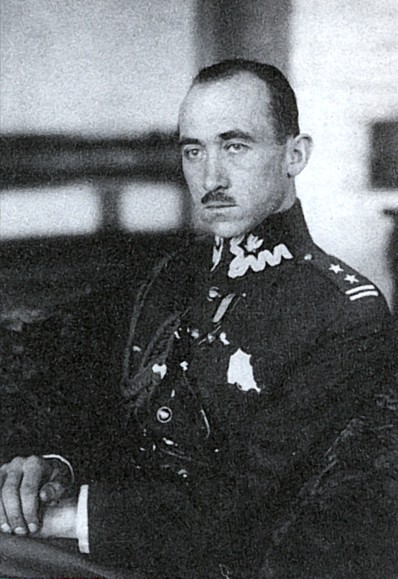
Schaetzel

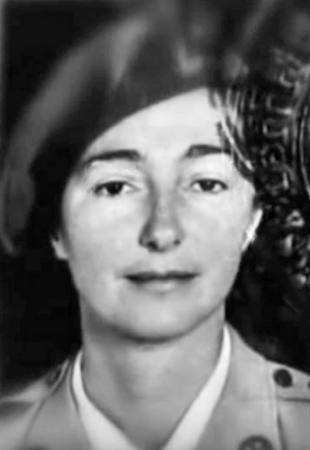
Skarbek

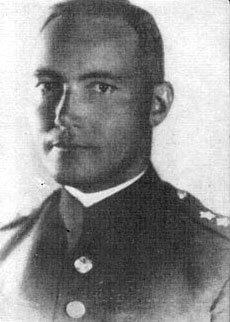
Włodarkiewicz

== Holocaust resistance ==
- Irena Adamowicz
- Mordechaj Anielewicz, Warsaw Ghetto Uprising
- Dawid Apfelbaum, Warsaw Ghetto Uprising
- Władysław Bartoszewski
- Adolf Berman
- Alexander Bogen (1916–2010), partisan leader
- Anna Borkowska (Sister Bertranda)
- Icchak Cukierman
- Gusta Dawidson Draenger
- Marek Edelman
- Leon Feldhendler (1910–1945)
- Hela Felenbaum-Weiss (1924–1988), partisan fighter
- Tuviah Friedman (1922–2011), Nazi hunter
- Izrael Kanal
- Yitzhak Gitterman
- Bernard Goldstein
- Haika Grossman
- Irena Gut
- Kazimierz Iranek-Osmecki, Polish Army officer, Home Army officer, historian of aid given to Jews in World War II by the Polish Underground State and by ordinary Polish civilians
- Henryk Iwański
- Jan Karski
- Juliusz Kühl
- Michał Klepfisz
- Zofia Kossak-Szczucka, co-founder of Żegota
- Wanda Krahelska-Filipowicz, co-founder of Żegota
- Countess Karolina Lanckorońska
- Zivia Lubetkin
- Aleksander Ładoś, Polish de facto Ambassador to Switzerland
- Edward Mosberg (1926–2022), Polish-American Holocaust survivor, educator, and philanthropist
- Maurycy Orzech
- Witold Pilecki
- Konstanty Rokicki, Polish consul in Bern who forged Paraguayan passports to rescue Jews
- Tadeusz Romer, Polish ambassador to Japan and in Shanghai Ghetto
- Stefan Ryniewicz, Polish diplomat
- Irena Sendler, saved nearly 2,500 Jewish children in World War II
- Joseph Serchuk (Józef Serczuk; 1919–1993), leader of a Jewish partisan unit in the Lublin area
- Halina Seyda, (1906–1944), Polish banker and underground activist killed by Nazis
- Henryk Sławik, "Polish Schindler", diplomat in Hungary
- Leopold Socha, another "Polish Schindler"
- Chaim Sztajer (1909–2008), known for his participation in the Treblinka uprising
- Simon Wiesenthal, Nazi hunter
- Józef and Wiktoria Ulma
- Jankiel Wiernik (י1888-1972), influential figure in the Treblinka extermination camp resistance
- Samuel Willenberg (1923–2016)
- Henryk Woliński
- Lidia Zamenhof
- Szmul Zygielbojm
- Jan and Antonina Żabiński
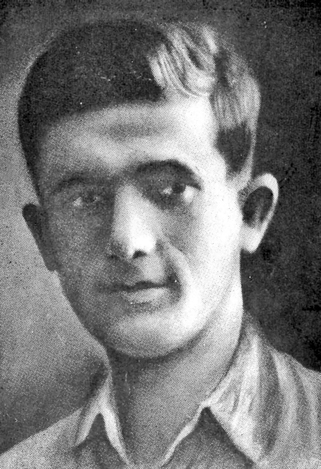
Anielewicz

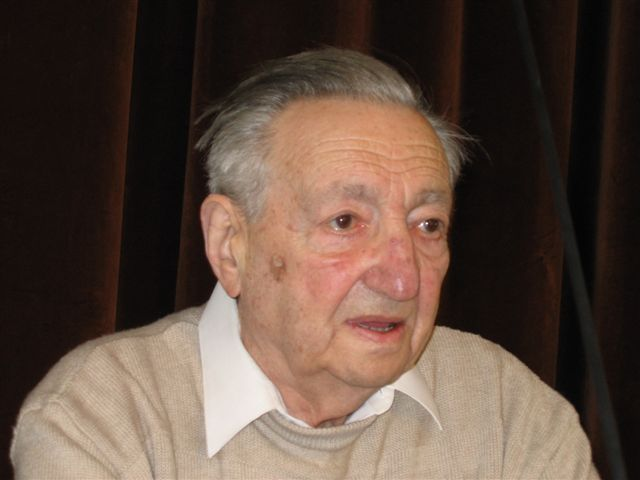
Edelman

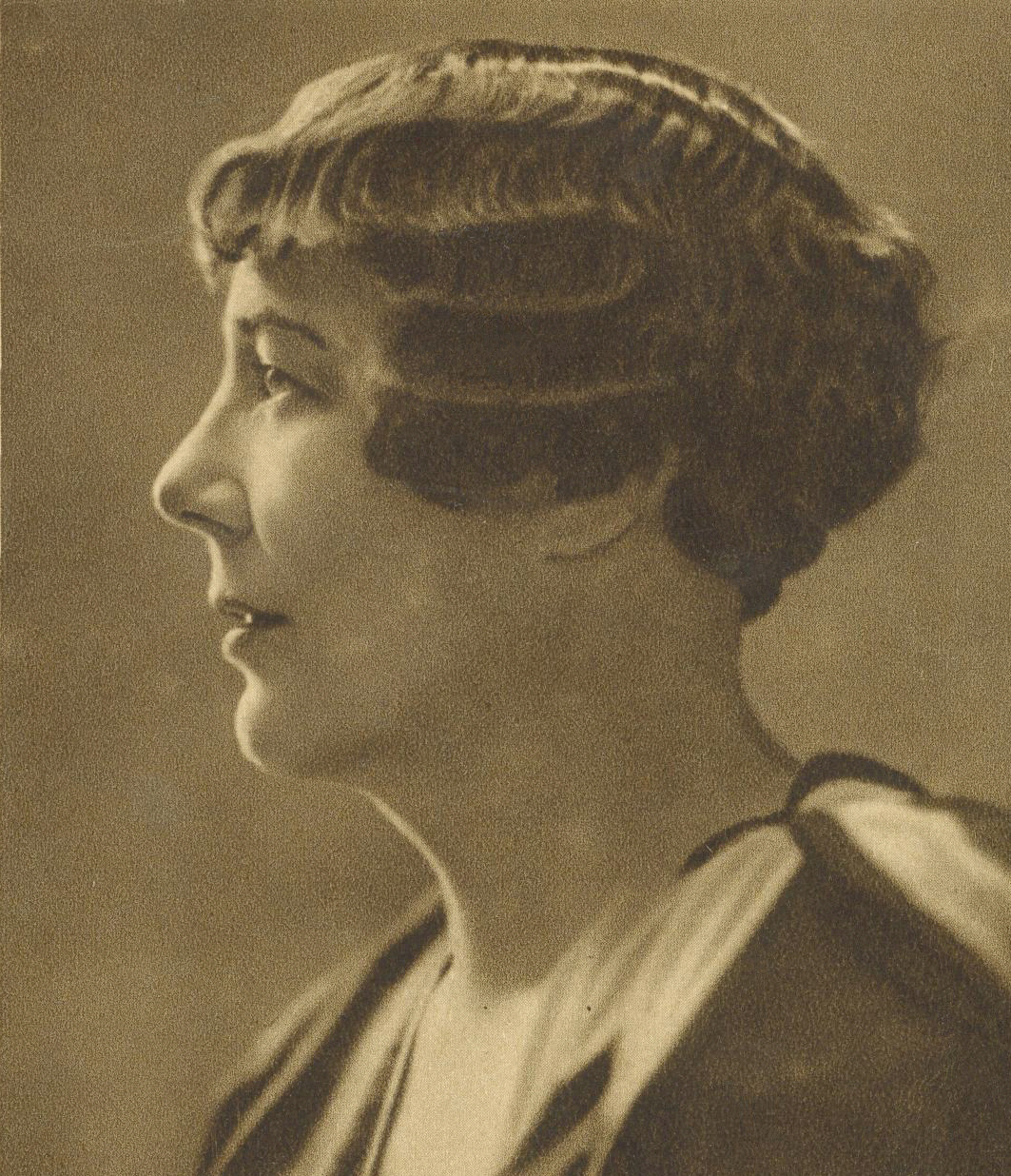
Kossak-Szczucka

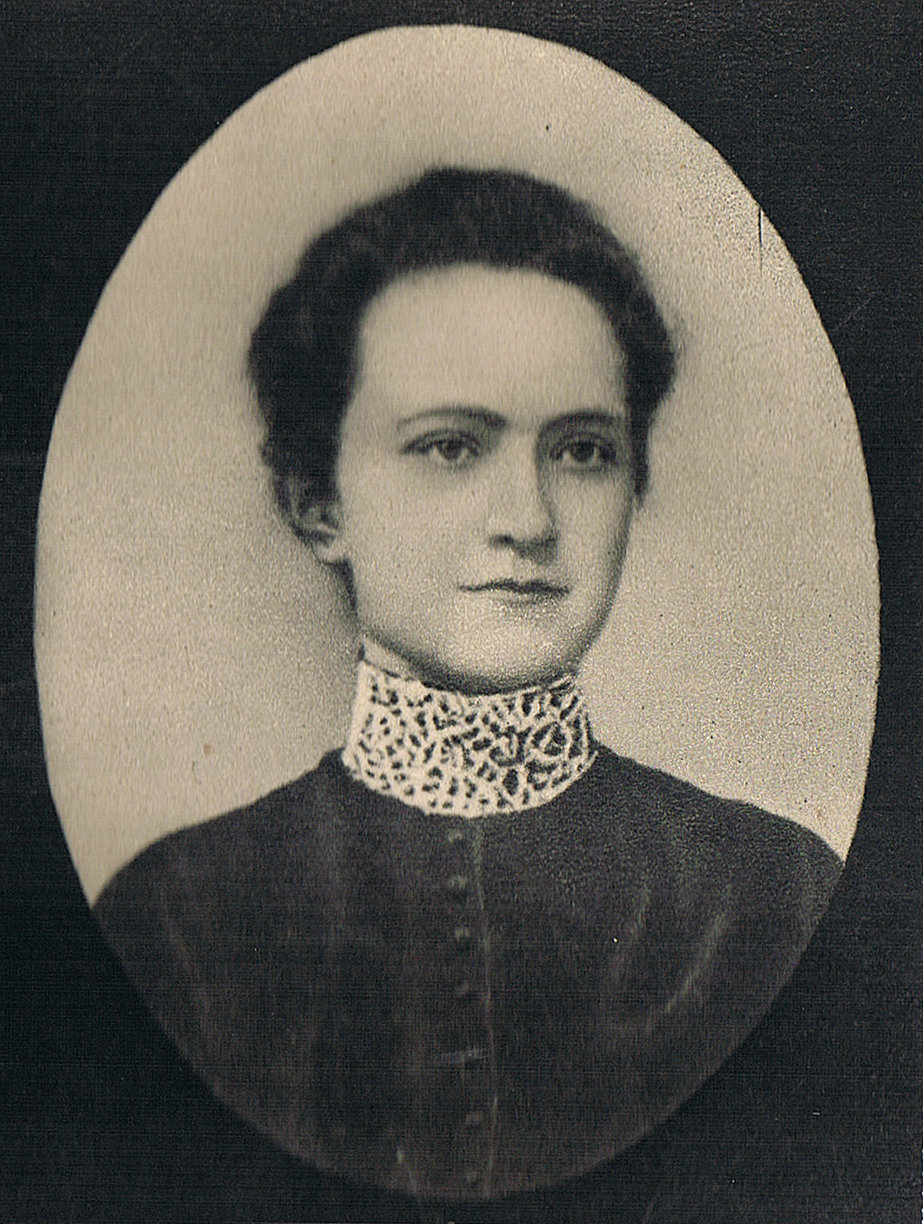
Krahelska

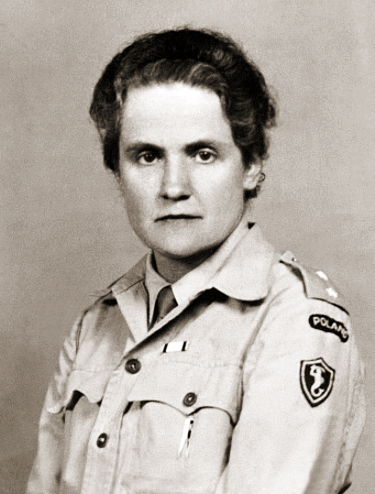
Lanckorońska

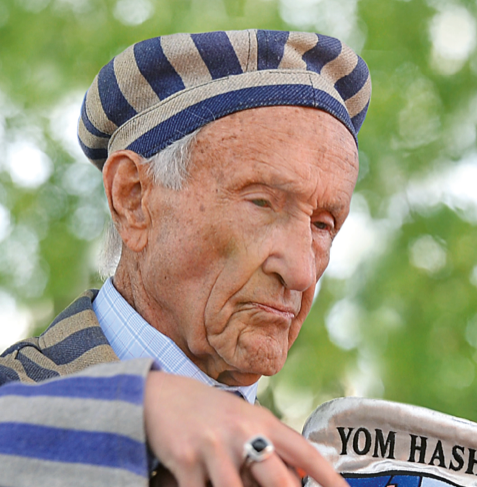
Edward Mosberg

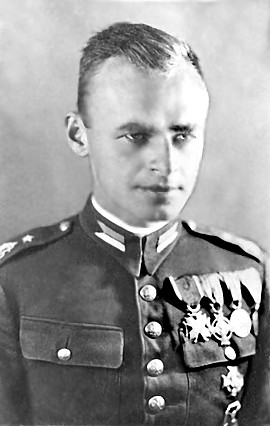
Pilecki

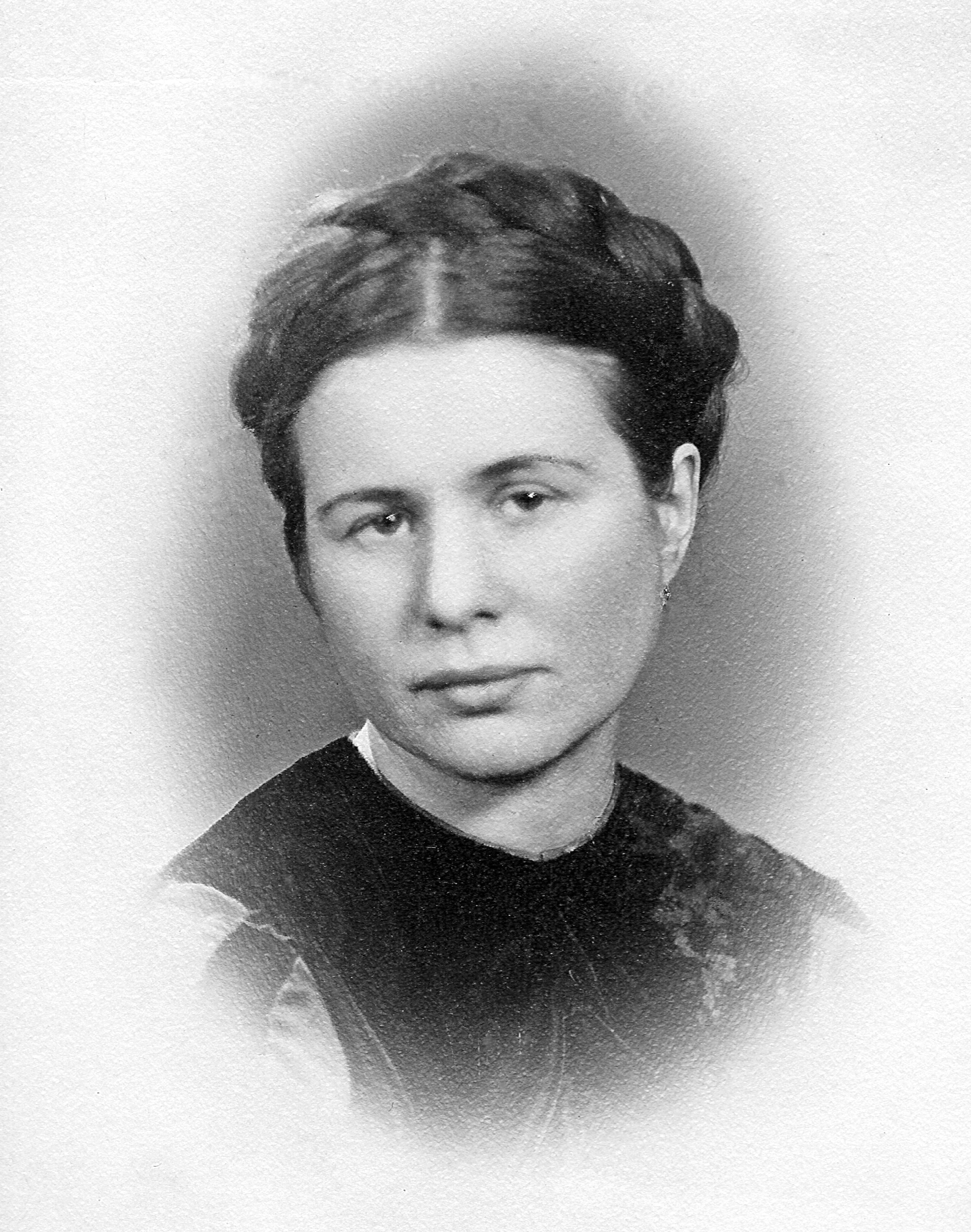
Sendler

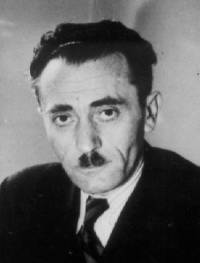
Zygielbojm

== Religion ==
- Yitzchak Meir Alter, Rebbe founder of the Ger Hasidic dynasty
- Andrzej Alojzy Ankwicz, Roman Catholic archbishop of Lwów (1815–33) and archbishop of Prague (1833–1838)
- Baal Shem Tov (Yisroel ben Eliezer, 1698–1760), rabbi and founder of Hasidic Judaism
- Blessed Jan Beyzym (1850–1912), Jesuit missionary among lepers in Madagascar
- St. Józef Bilczewski, Roman Catholic Archbishop of Lwów, 1900–1923
- St. Andrew Bobola, Jesuit
- St. Evan Yurewicz, Catholic, missionary
- Tadeusz Brzozowski, elected first Jesuit Superior General after the restoration of the Society of Jesus
- Szymon Budny, Polish-Belarusian humanist and Arian priest
- Juliusz Bursche, Polish Lutheran bishop killed by the Germans at Sachsenhausen concentration camp
- St. Casimir Jagiellon, grandson of King Władysław II Jagiełło
- St. Adam (Albert) Chmielowski (Albertine order)
- Bl. August Czartoryski, Prince
- Edmund Dalbor, Primate of Poland, Cardinal, 1915–1926
- Albin Dunajewski, Bishop of Kraków, Cardinal, 1879–1894
- Stanisław Dziwisz, Archbishop of Kraków, since 2005, Cardinal
- St. Zygmunt Szczesny Felinski, founder of the Franciscan Sisters of the Family of Mary, Archbishop of Warsaw (1862), exiled and Titular Archbishop of Tarsus (1882)
- Antoni Melchior Fijałkowski, Archbishop of Warsaw, 1856–1861
- Jacob Frank, Jewish messianic leader who combined Judaism and Christianity
- Andrzej Frycz Modrzewski, vicar, humanist, and theologian
- Piotr Gamrat, Primate of Poland, 1541–1545
- Józef Gawlina, military bishop, Divisional general, theologian, archbishop
- Józef Glemp, Primate of Poland, 1981–2006
- Adam Stanisław Grabowski, Prince-Bishop of Warmia
- Michał Heller, physicist and philosopher, Templeton Prize laureate
- August Hlond, Primate of Poland, 1926–1948, Cardinal
- Stanislaus Hosius, legate to Poland, Cardinal and Prince-Bishop of Warmia
- St. Hyacinth, Dominican
- St. Jadwiga, Queen of Poland, 1384–1399
- Henryk Jankowski, Prelate, Chaplain of "Solidarność"
- Marian Jaworski, Roman Catholic Archbishop of Lviv, 1991–2008, Cardinal
- Aleksander Kakowski, Archbishop of Warsaw, Cardinal
- St. Raphael Kalinowski, Carmelite
- St. Jan Kanty, professor at Kraków University
- Stanisław Karnkowski, Primate of Poland, 1581–1603; Interrex, 1586–1587
- St. Stanisław Kazimierczyk, priest and preacher
- Chaim Kreiswirth, Chief Rabbi of Congregation Machzikei Hadass Antwerp, founder and rosh yeshiva of the Mercaz HaTorah yeshiva in Jerusalem
- St. Maksymilian Maria Kolbe, Franciscan martyr, Auschwitz 1941
- Hugo Kołłątaj, priest, statesman
- Bolesław Kominek, Archbishop of Wrocław, 1972–1974, Cardinal
- St. Stanisław Kostka, Jesuit
- St. Faustina Kowalska, Sisters of the Blessed Virgin Mary of Mercy
- Maria Michał Kowalski, Archbishop of the Catholic Church of the Mariavites, introduced women clergy in 1929
- Adam Kozłowiecki, Jesuit, Archbishop of Lusaka, Cardinal
- Feliksa Kozłowska, inspiration of the Mariavite Church
- Ignacy Krasicki, Primate of Poland
- Adam Stanisław Krasiński, Bishop of Kamieniec Podolski, 1757–1798
- John Krol, Archbishop of Philadelphia, Cardinal, 1961–1988
- Mieczysław Halka Ledóchowski, Primate of Poland, 1866–1886, Cardinal
- Mary Theresa Ledóchowska, missionary, founder of the Missionary Sisters of St. Peter Claver
- Saint Ursula Ledóchowska, religious leader, founder of the Congregation of the Ursulines of the Agonizing Heart of Jesus
- Włodzimierz Halka Ledóchowski, Superior General of the Society of Jesus (1915–1942)
- Jan Łaski (1456–1531), Primate of Poland, 1510–1531
- Jan Łaski (1499–1560), Protestant reformer; nephew of the Primate
- Władysław Aleksander Łubieński, Archbishop of Lwów, Primate of Poland, 1759–1767; Interrex, 1763–1764
- Franciszek Macharski, Archbishop of Kraków, 1978–2005, Cardinal
- Ryszard Markwart, Catholic priest and national activist
- Aleksander Meysztowicz, papal chamberlain
- Tomasz Miśkiewicz, mufti of the Muslim Religious Organisation and Imam of Białystok
- Mieczysław Mokrzycki, Roman Catholic Archbishop of Lviv, since 2008
- Mikołaj Stanisław Oborski (1576–1646), Jesuit
- Zbigniew Oleśnicki, Bishop of Kraków, 1423–1455; first Cardinal of Polish origin, from 1449; statesman
- Zbigniew Oleśnicki, nephew of Zbigniew Oleśnicki; Cardinal Primate of Poland, 1481–1493
- Edward O'Rourke, bishop of Gdańsk
- Piotr of Goniądz, spiritual leader of the Polish Brethren
- Jerzy Popiełuszko, Catholic priest and dissident assassinated by the Polish security service in 1984, martyr of the Church
- Walenty Potocki (died 1749), Count; converted to Judaism as Avrohom ben Avrohom, the Ger Tzedek of Vilna
- Tadeusz Puder (1908–1945), Polish Roman Catholic priest of Jewish origin
- Anastazja Pustelnik (1950–2026), nun, member of the Daughters of Divine Charity who wrote 17 cookbooks
- Jan Puzyna, Bishop of Kraków, 1895–1911, Cardinal
- Jerzy Radziwiłł, Bishop of Kraków, Cardinal, 1591–1600
- Sholom Rokeach, the first Belzer Rebbe, 1817–1855
- Tadeusz Rydzyk, Redemptorist, broadcast radio controller
- Czeslaw Sokolowski, Roman Catholic priest, theologian, university rector
- St. Stanisław of Szczepanów, Bishop of Kraków, martyr 1079
- Adam Stefan Sapieha, Bishop/Archbishop of Kraków, Cardinal, 1911–1951
- Franciszka Siedliska, religious leader, founder of Congregation of the Holy Family of Nazareth
- Piotr Skarga, Jesuit preacher
- Kajetan Sołtyk, Bishop of Kyiv, 1756–59; Bishop of Kraków, 1759–1788
- Boruch Steinberg, the first Rabbi and an officer of the Polish Army before and during World War II
- Kazimierz Świątek, Roman Catholic Archbishop of Minsk-Mohilev; Apostolic Administrator of Pinsk, Cardinal
- Edmund Szoka, Catholic Archbishop of Detroit, Cardinal 1981–1990
- Jakub Szynkiewicz (1884–1966), Imam of Poland, translated portions of Qur'an into Polish
- Jozef Teodorowicz, last Armenian Catholic Archbishop of Lwow (1864–1938)
- Hipolit Terlecki, theologian
- Józef Tischner, priest, philosopher and first chaplain of the trade union, Solidarity
- Andrzej Towiański, philosopher and 19th century messianist
- Mikołaj Trąba, Archbishop of Gniezno, first Primate of Poland, 1418–1422
- Jakub Uchański, Primate of Poland, 1562–1581; Interrex, 1572–73 and 1574–1575
- Vilna Gaon (1720–1797), non-Hassidic Jewish leader, the "saintly genius from Vilnius"
- Piotr Wawrzyniak, priest, economist and activist (1849–1910)
- Chaim Elozor Wax (1822–1887), rabbi
- Karol Józef Wojtyła, Auxiliary Bishop of Kraków 1958–1963, Archbishop of Kraków 1963–1978, Pope John Paul II 1978–2005
- Stefan Wyszyński, Primate of Poland, Cardinal, 1948–1981
- Lawrence Wnuk, Protonotary apostolic, decorated Polish Canadian, (1908–2006)
- Schneur Zalman, first Hasidic Rebbe of Chabad (1745–1810)
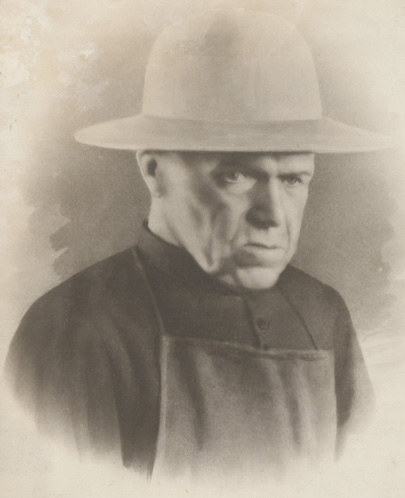
Beyzym

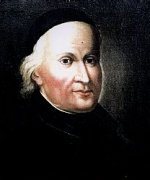
Tadeusz Brzozowski

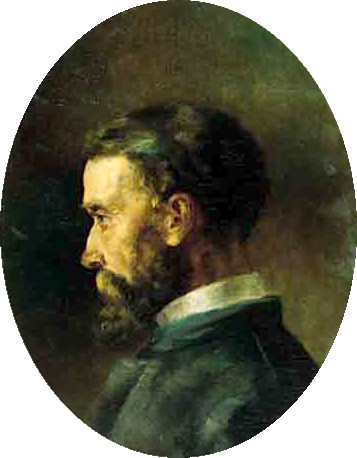
Chmielowski

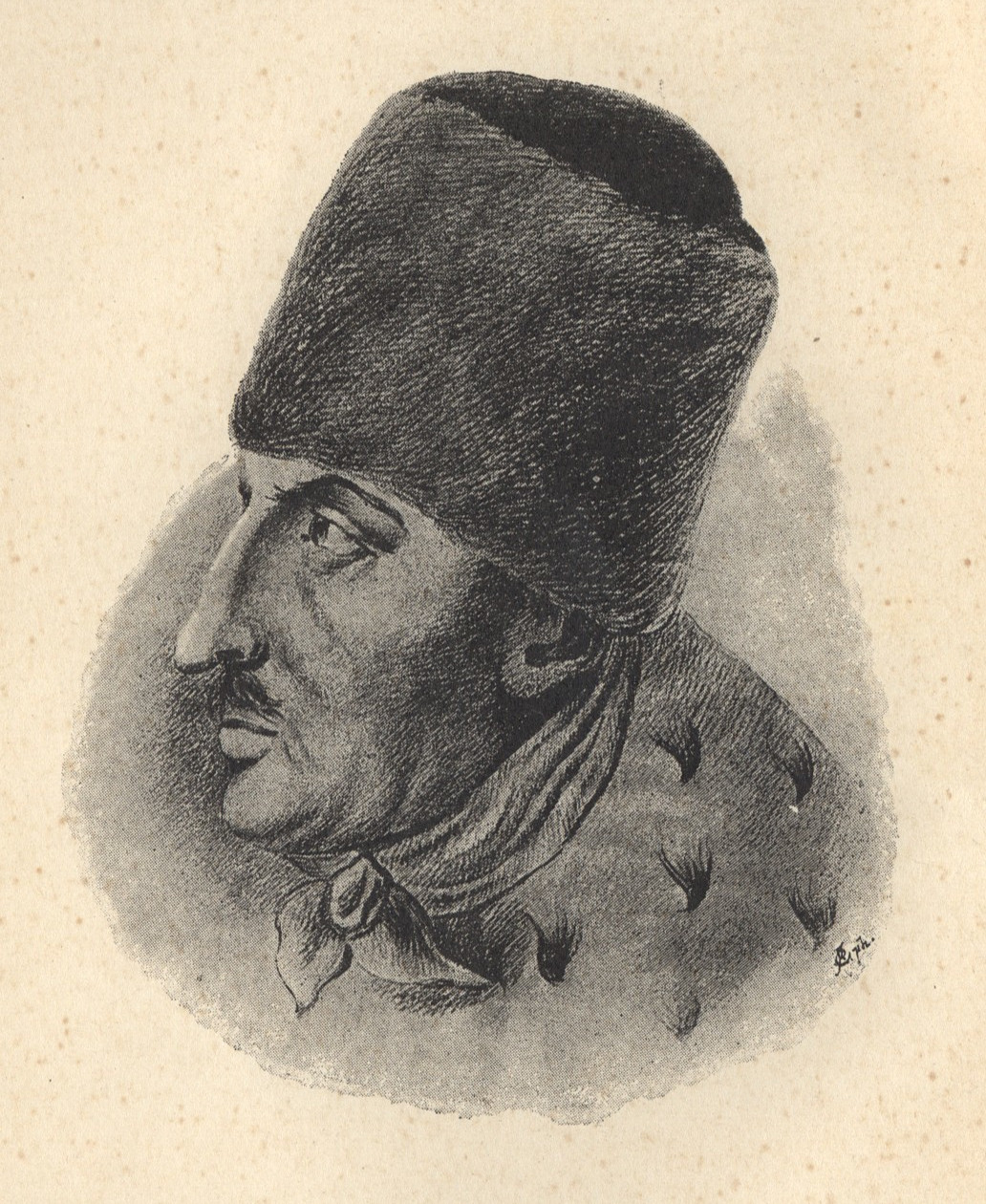
Frank

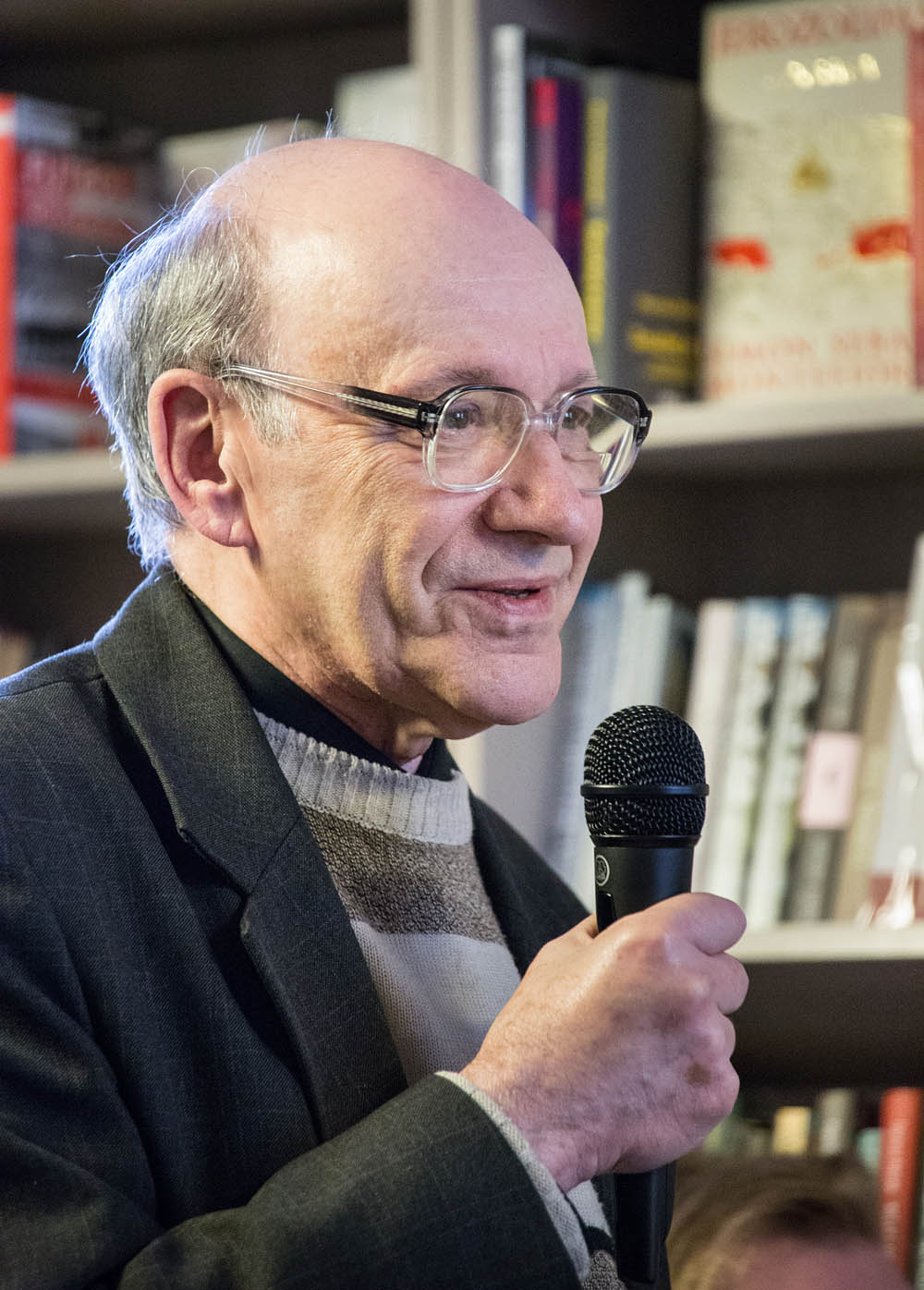
Heller

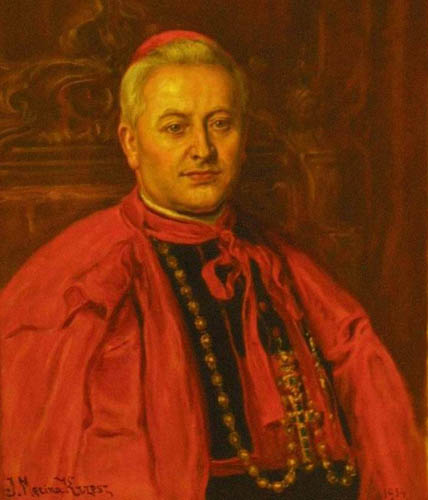
Hlond

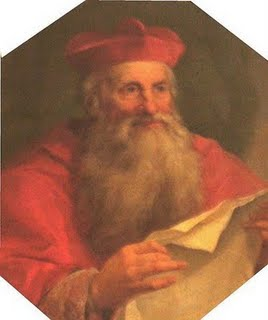
Hosius

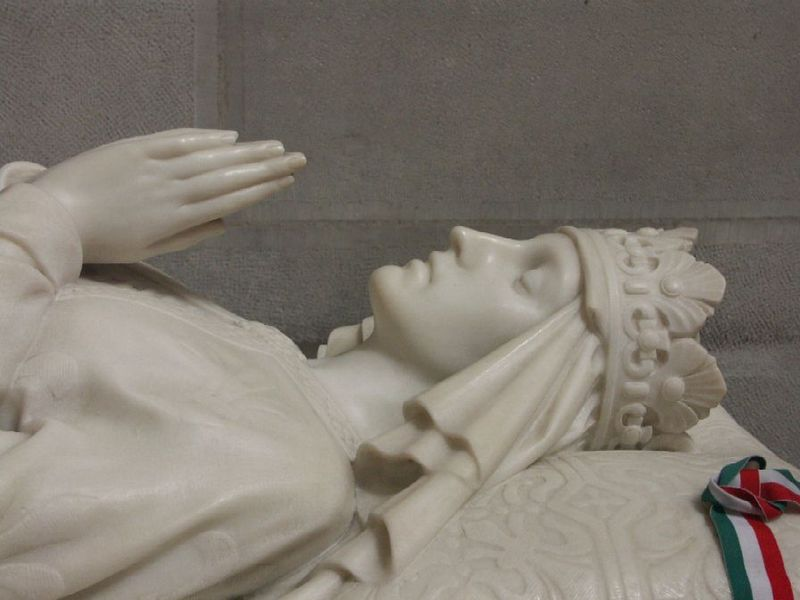
Jadwiga

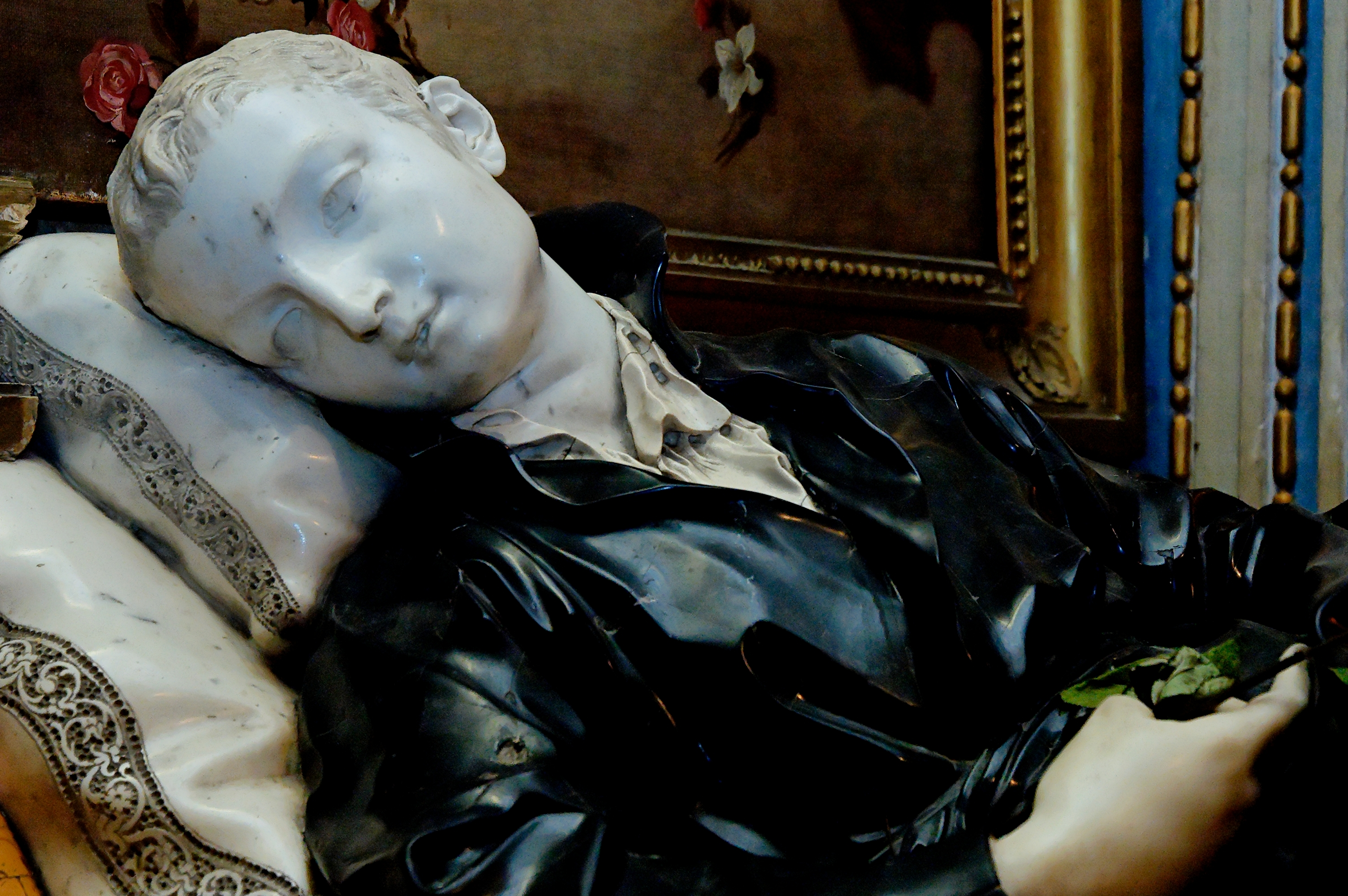
Stanisław Kostka

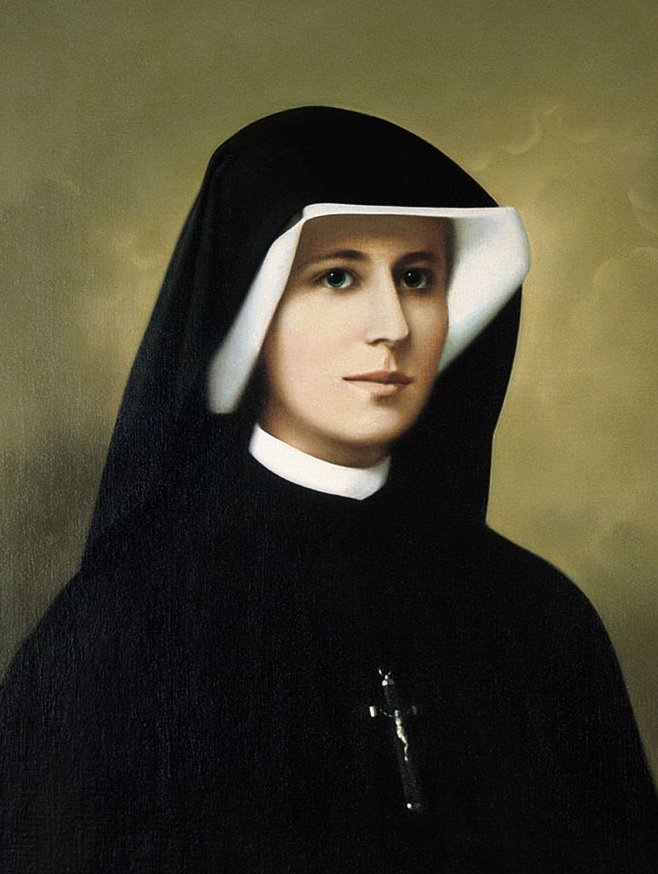
Kowalska

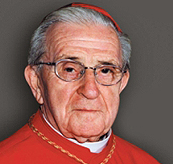
Kozłowiecki

Włodzimierz Ledóchowski

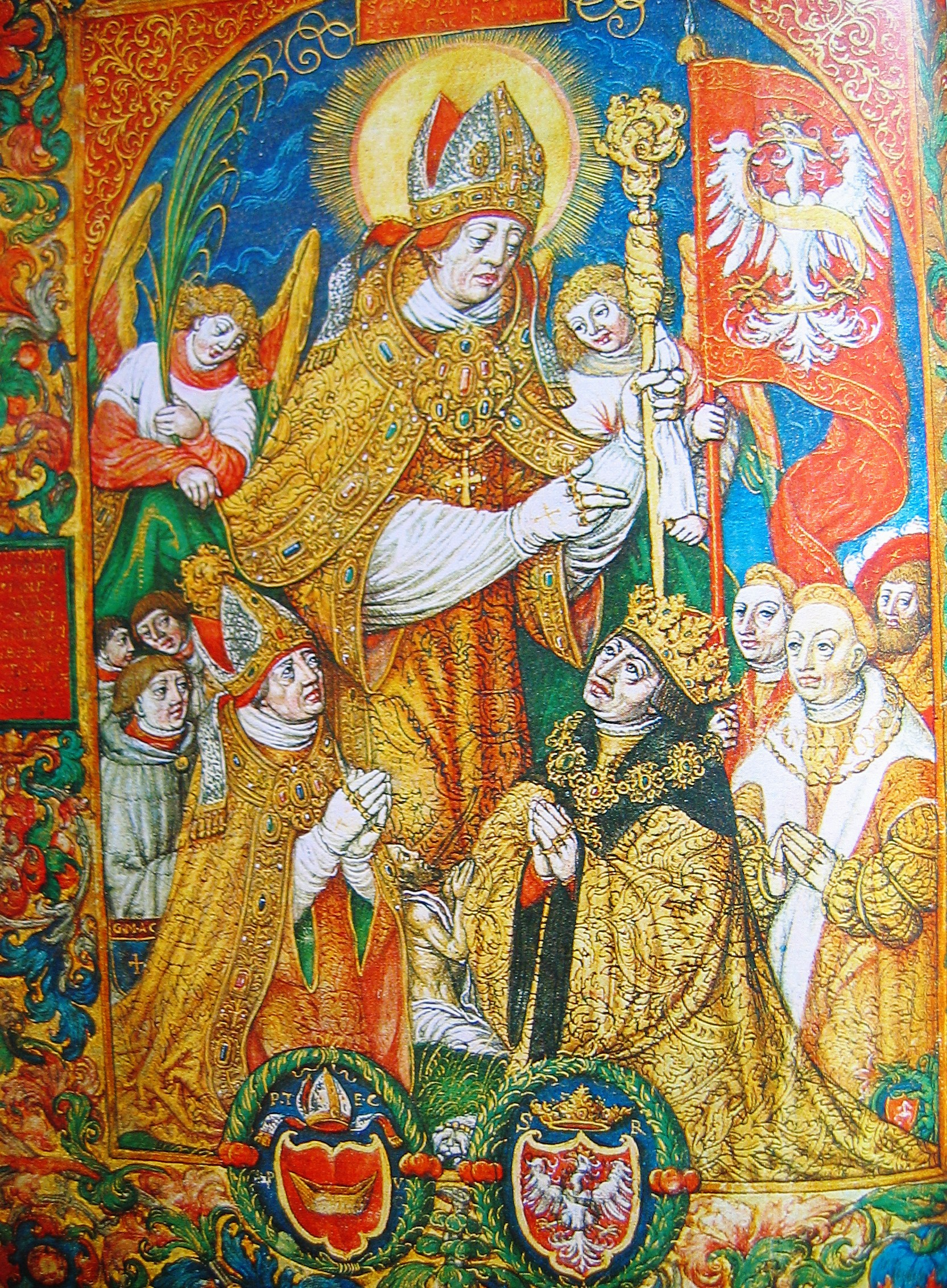
Stanisław of Szczepanów

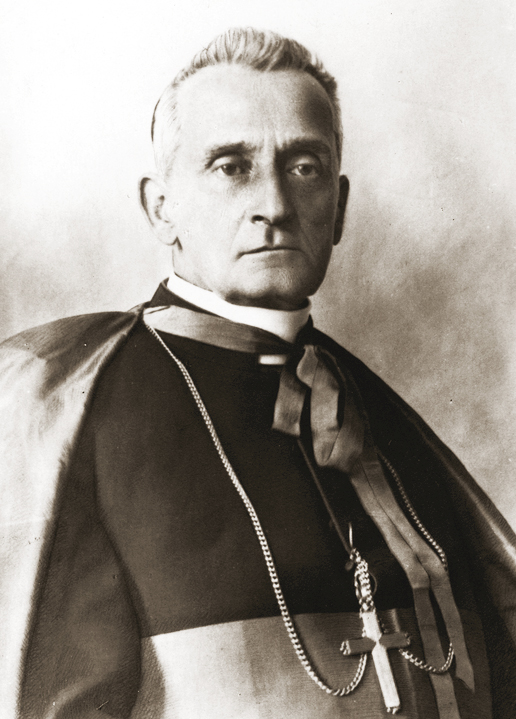
Sapieha

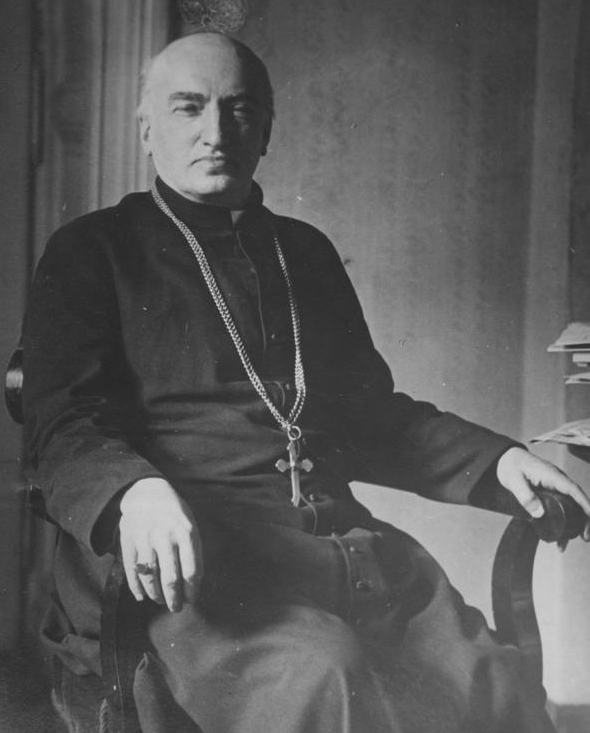
Teodorowicz

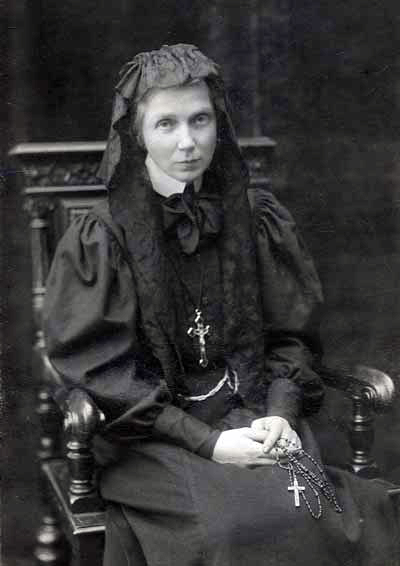
Saint Ursula

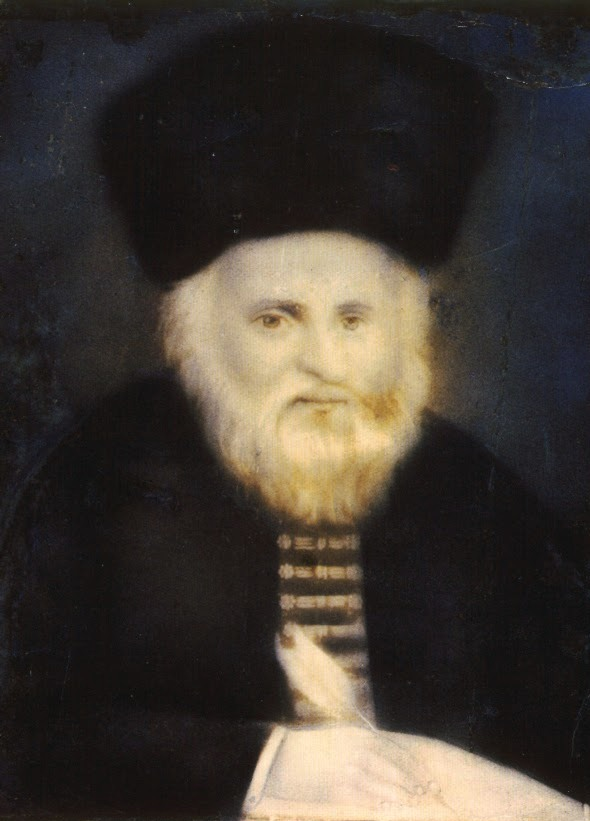
Vilna Gaon

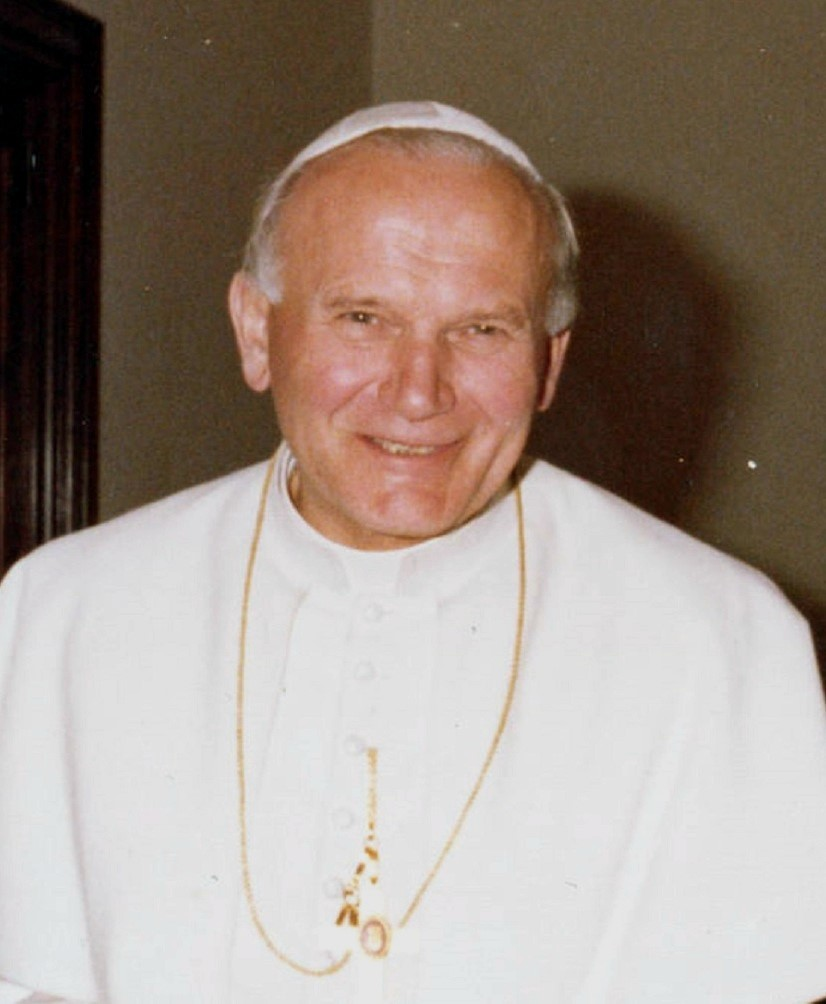
Wojtyła

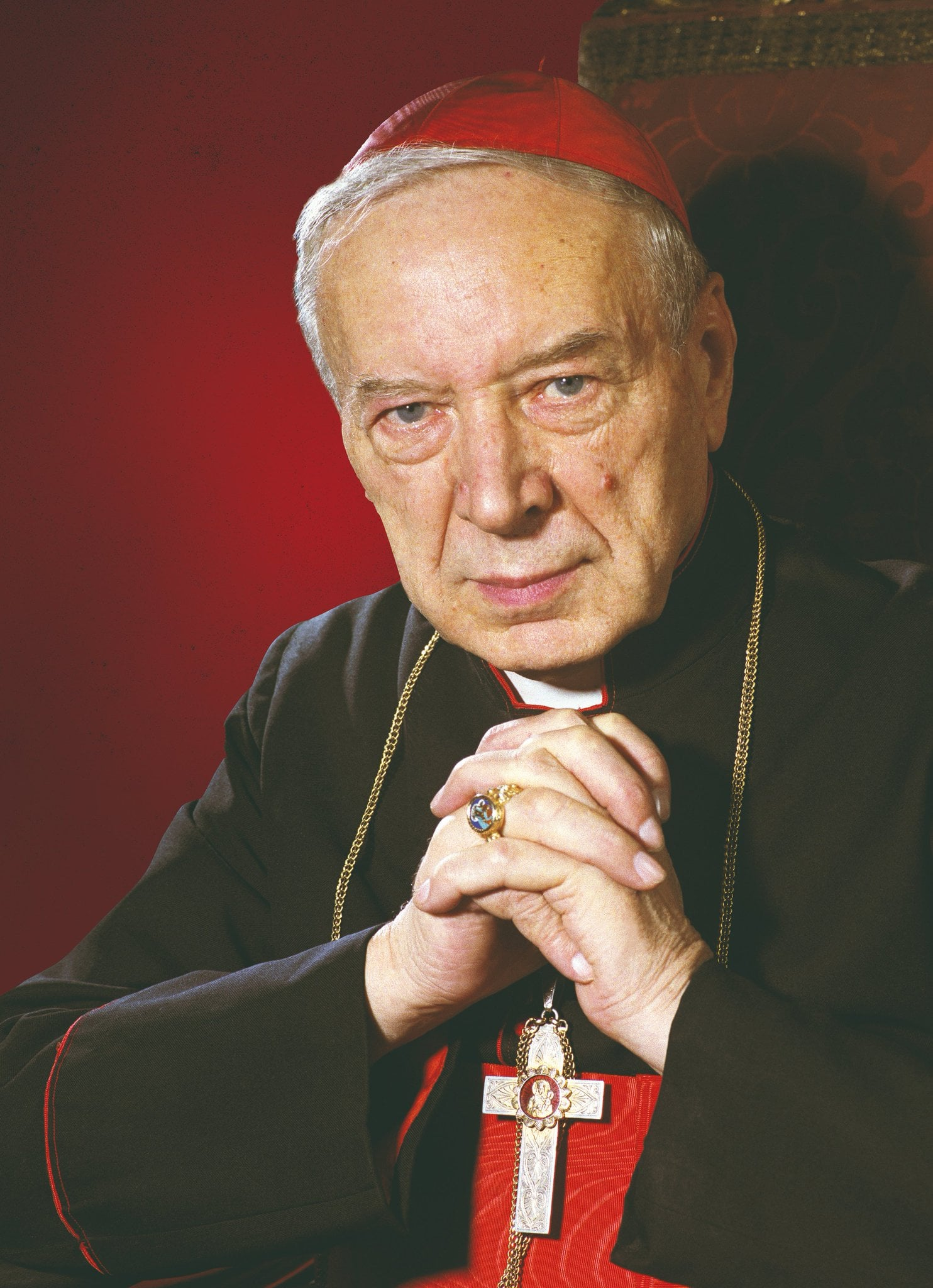
Wyszyński

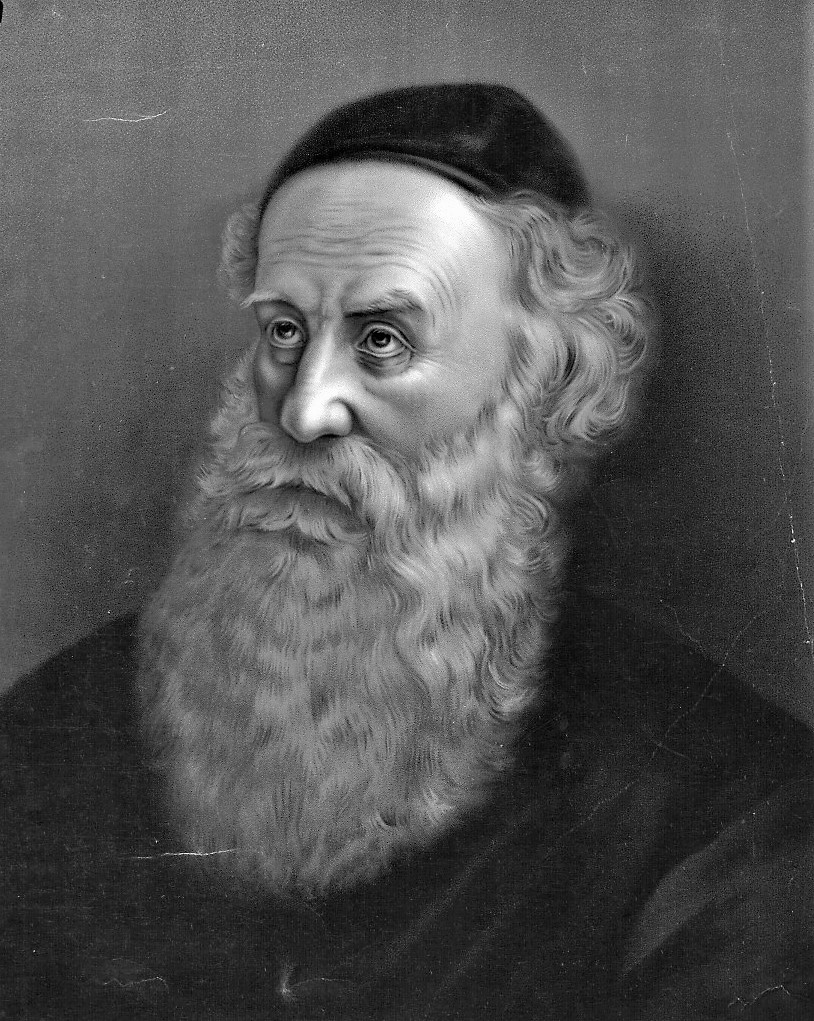
Zalman

== Royalty ==
- Mieszko I, first Duke of Poland
- Doubravka of Bohemia, first Duchess of Poland
- Świętosława (Gunhild), daughter of Mieszko I of Poland, mother of Canute the Great, King of England, Denmark and Norway
- Bolesław I the Brave, first King of Poland
- Mieszko II Lambert, second King of Poland
- Richeza of Lotharingia, queen of Poland
- Casimir I the Restorer, duke of Poland
- Bolesław II the Bold, third King of Poland
- Władysław I Herman, duke of Poland
- Bolesław III Wrymouth, duke of Poland
- Mieszko III the Old, duke of Greater Poland, Senior Duke of Poland
- Casimir II the Just, duke of Cracow, Senior Duke of Poland
- Leszek I the White, duke of Cracow, Senior Duke of Poland
- Henry I the Bearded, duke of Silesia, Senior Duke of Poland
- Konrad I of Masovia, duke of Mazovia and Kuyavia
- Henry II the Pious, senior duke of Poland, commander of Polish forces in the Battle of Legnica (1241)
- Przemysł II, King of Poland
- Władysław I the Elbow-high, king of Poland
- Louis I of Hungary, king of Poland
- Elizabeth of Poland, Queen of Hungary, Regent in Poland
- Casimir III the Great, Piast Dynasty last King of Poland
- Jadwiga of Poland, first female monarch of Poland
- Władysław II Jagiełło, Lithuanian, king of Poland, victor at the Battle of Grunwald (1410)
- Władysław III of Varna (Ulászló I), king of Poland and Hungary, killed at the Battle of Varna (1444)
- Casimir IV Jagiellon, king of Poland and Grand Duke of Lithuania, victor in the Thirteen Years' War (1454–1466)
- John I Albert, king of Poland
- Alexander Jagiellon, grand duke of Lithuania and king of Poland
- Sigismund I the Old, king of Poland and Grand Duke of Lithuania
- Roxelana (Khourrem, wife of Suleiman the Magnificent)
- Barbara Radziwiłłówna, consort of Sigismund II August
- Bona Sforza, Queen consort of Poland
- Sigismund II Augustus, last Jagiellon king of the Polish–Lithuanian Commonwealth
- Anna Jagiellon, reigned together with her husband Stephen Báthory
- Henry III of France, king of Polish-Lithuanian Commonwealth
- Stephen Báthory, Hungarian-born king of the Polish–Lithuanian Commonwealth
- Sigismund III Vasa, king of the Polish–Lithuanian Commonwealth and king of Sweden
- Władysław IV Vasa, elected Tsar of Russia, king of the Polish–Lithuanian Commonwealth
- Marie Louise Gonzaga, Queen of Poland, Grand Duchess of Lithuania
- John II Casimir Vasa, king of the Polish–Lithuanian Commonwealth, victor at the Battle of Beresteczko (1651)
- John III Sobieski, king of the Polish–Lithuanian Commonwealth, victor at the Battle of Vienna (1683)
- Maria Clementina Sobieska, queen of France, England, Scotland and Ireland
- Michael I, king of Polish-Lithuanian Commonwealth
- Stanisław Leszczyński, king of the Polish–Lithuanian Commonwealth and Duke of Lorraine
- Marie Leszczyńska, Queen consort of France
- Catherine Opalińska, queen of the Polish–Lithuanian Commonwealth and Duchess of Lorraine
- Augustus II the Strong, king of Poland, Elector of Saxony
- Augustus III of Poland, king of Poland, Elector of Saxony
- Maria Amalia of Saxony, consort of Carlos III, king of Spain
- Stanisław August Poniatowski, last king of the Poland, co-author of the Constitution of 3 May 1791
- Princess Maria Christina of Saxony (1770–1851), Princess Carignano House of Savoy
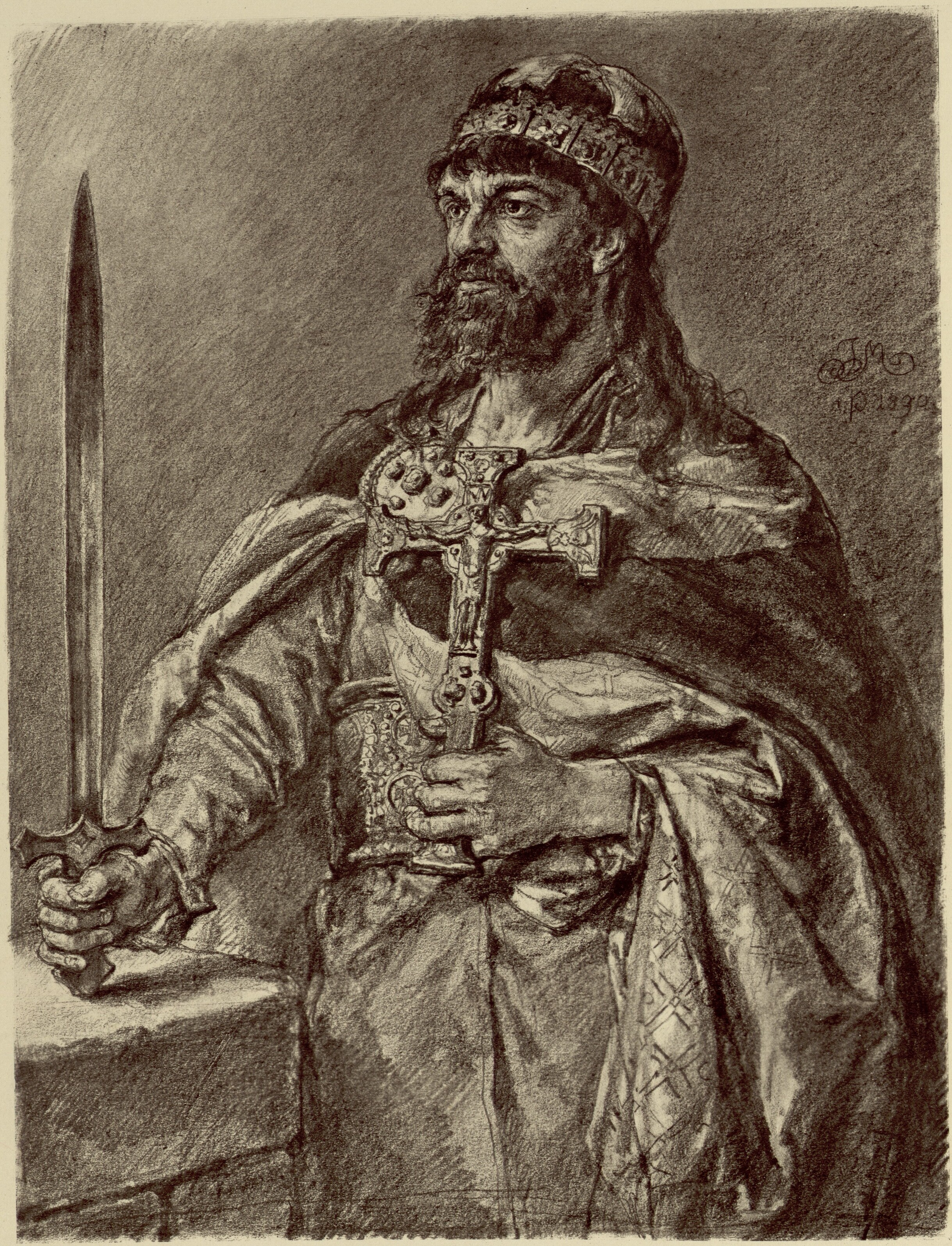
Mieszko

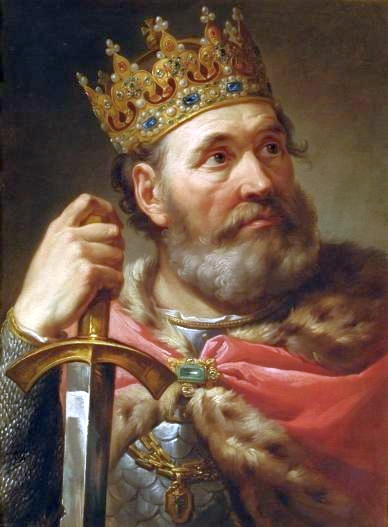
Chrobry

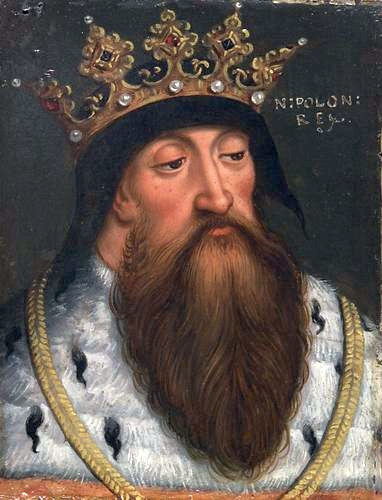
Elbow-high

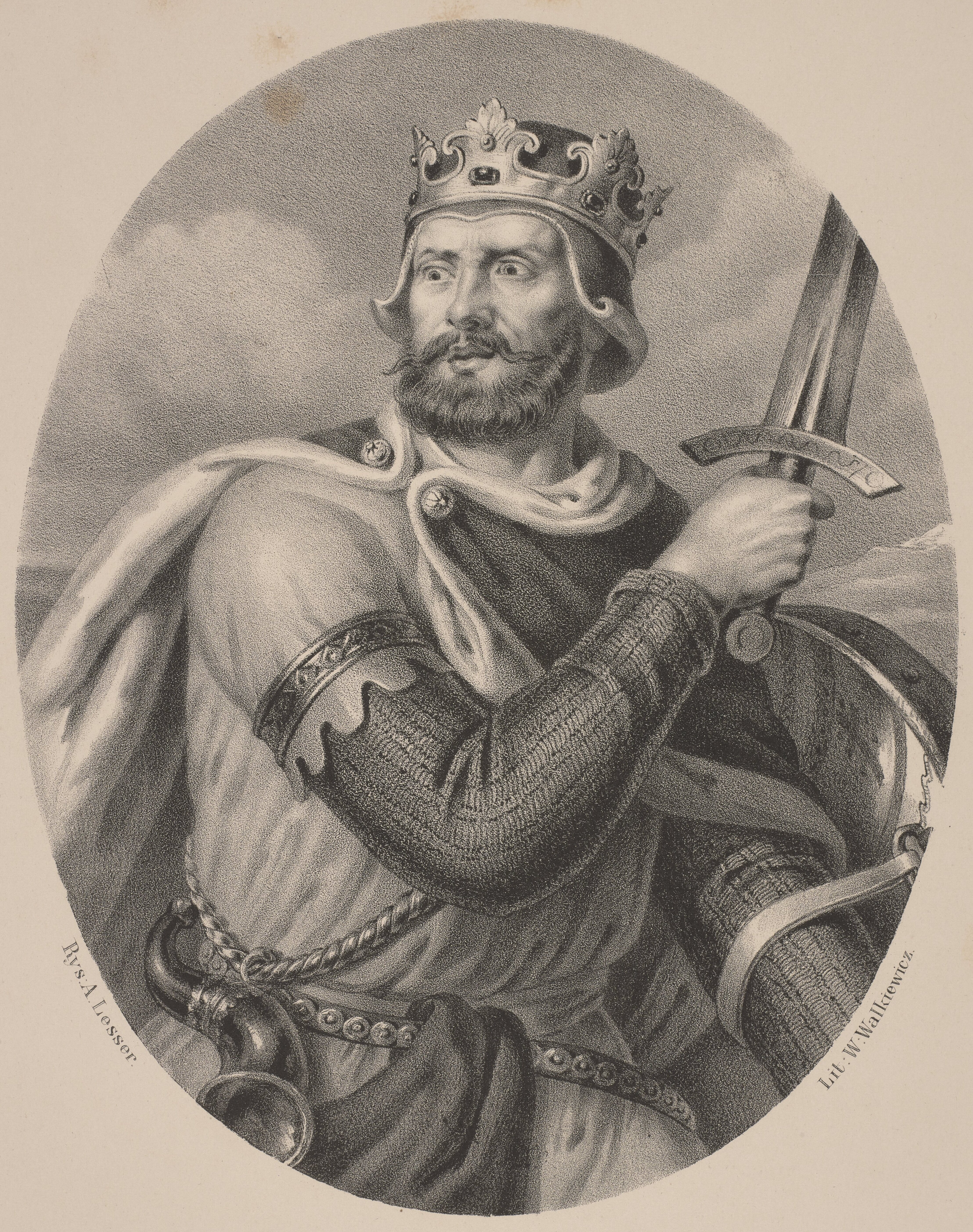
Wrymouth

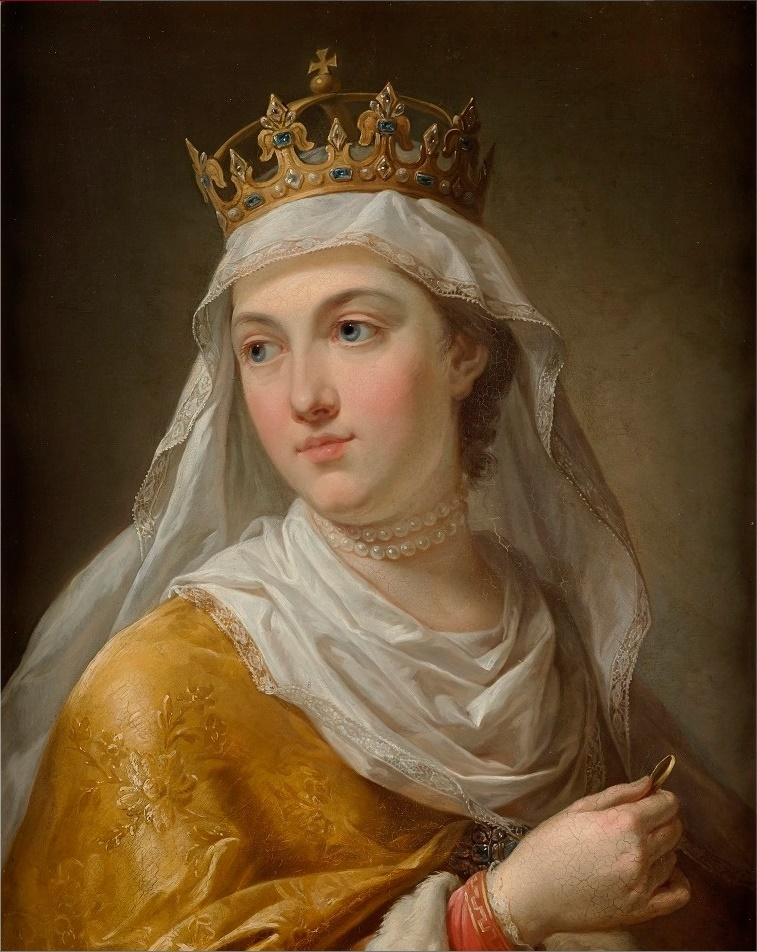
Jadwiga

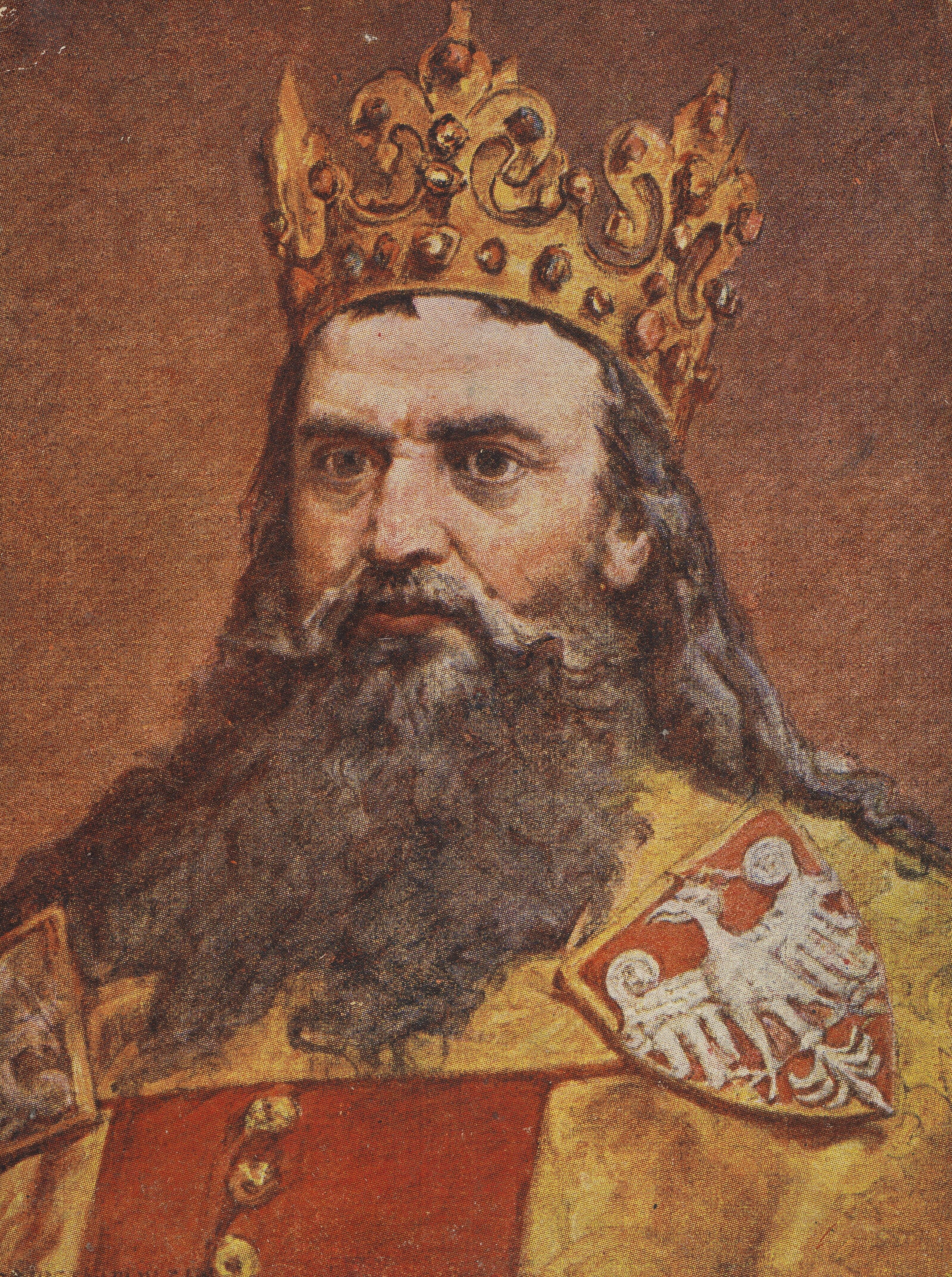
Casimir the Great

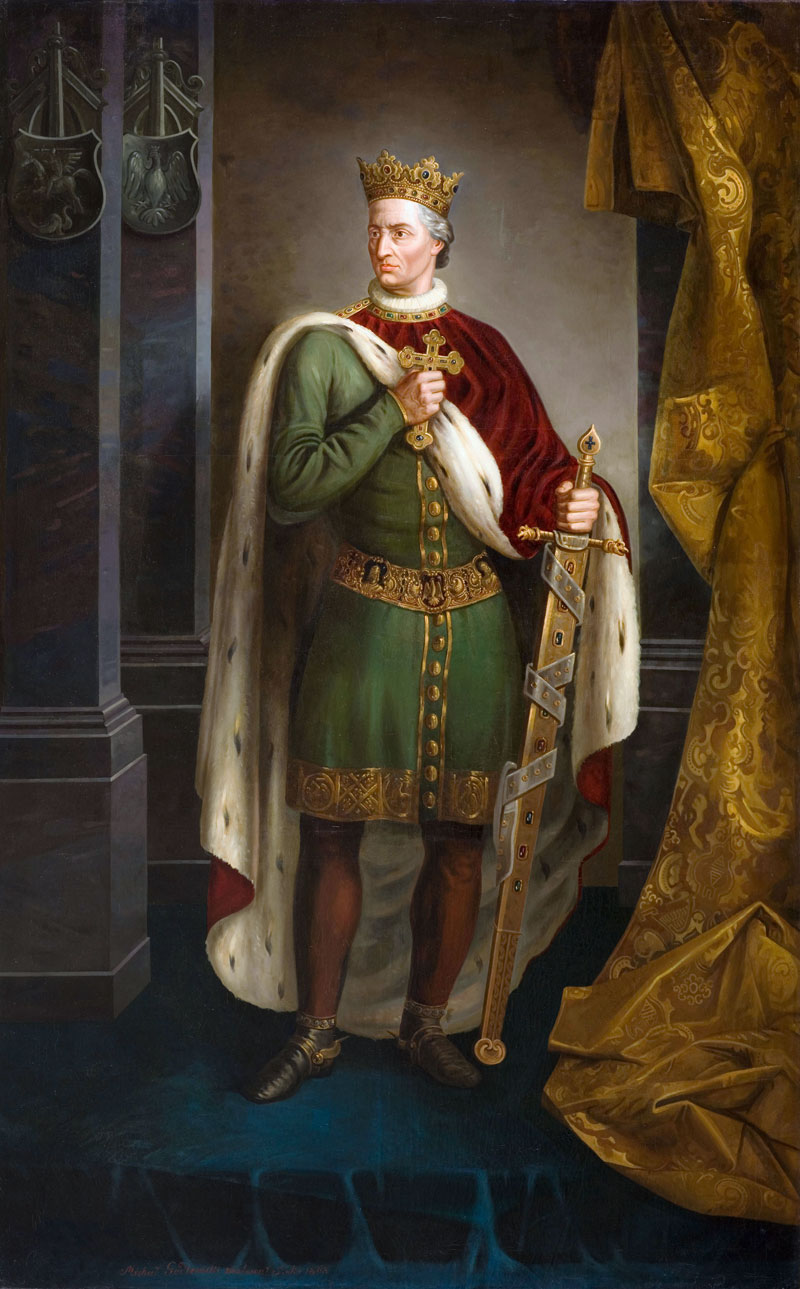
Jagiełło

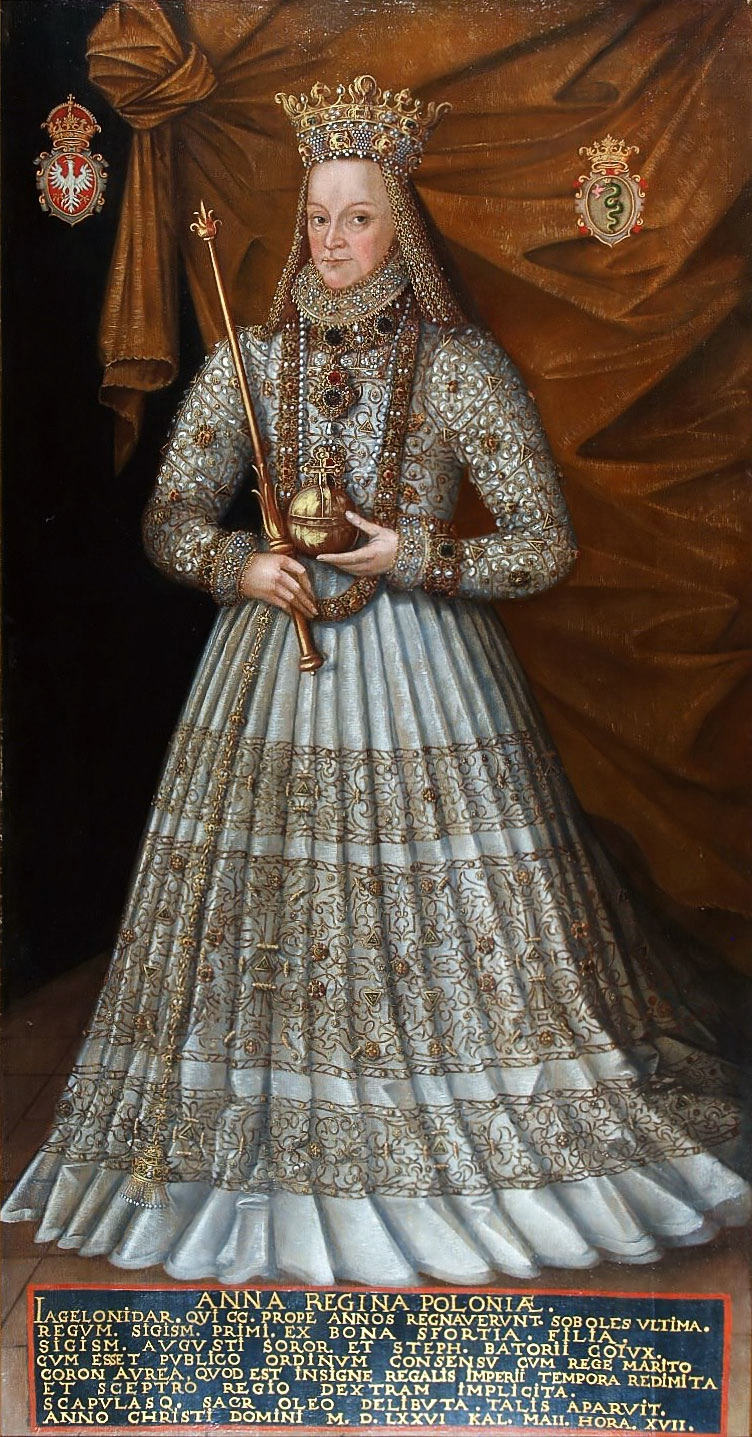
Jagiellonka

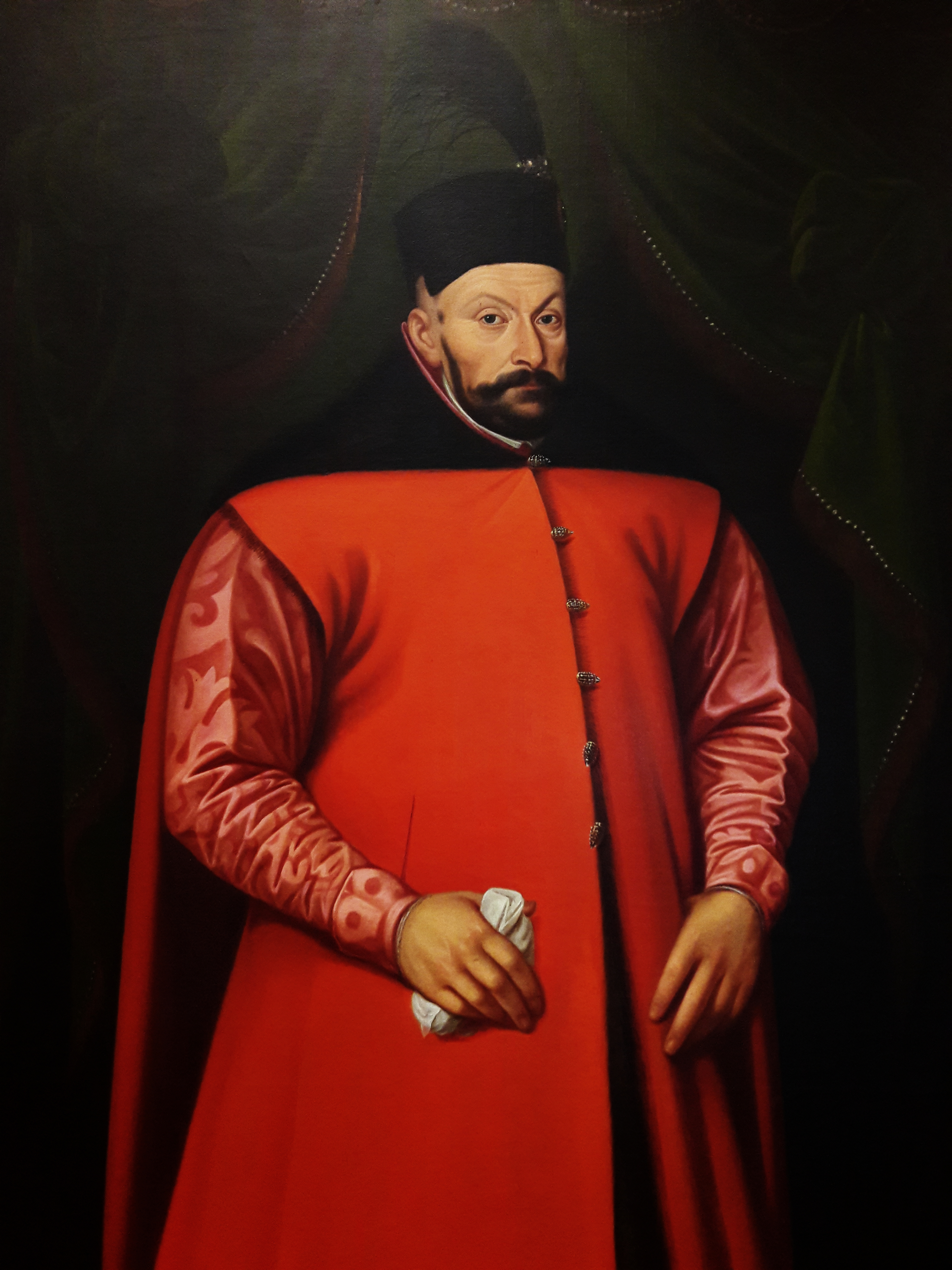
Batory

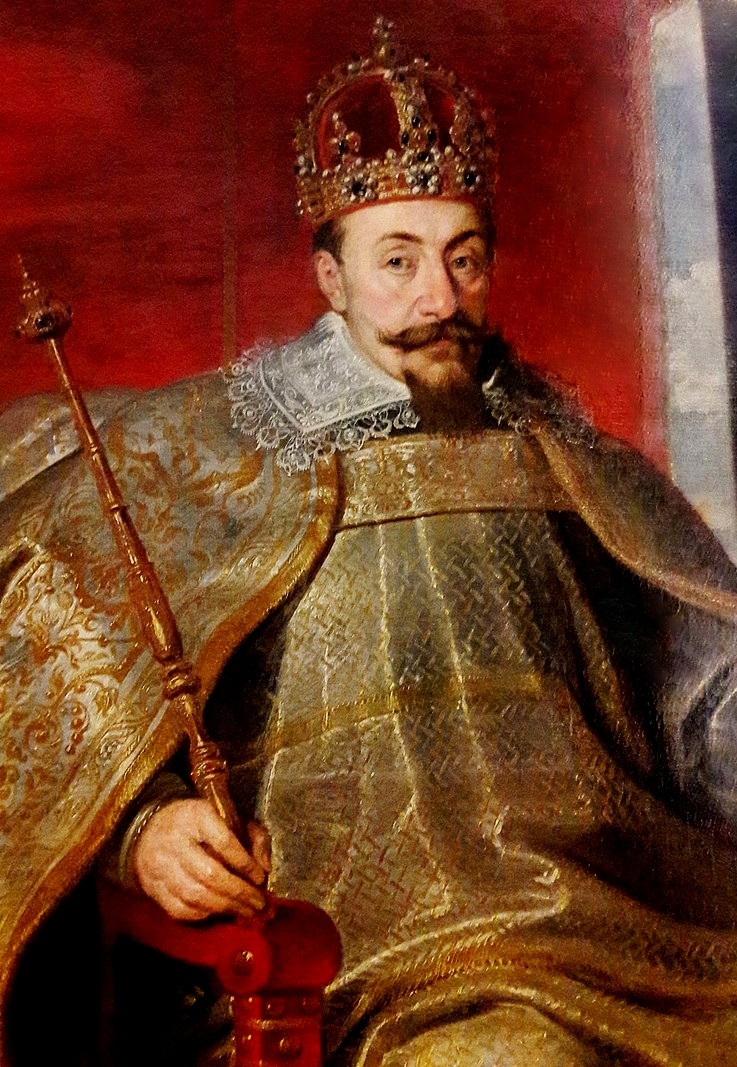
Vasa

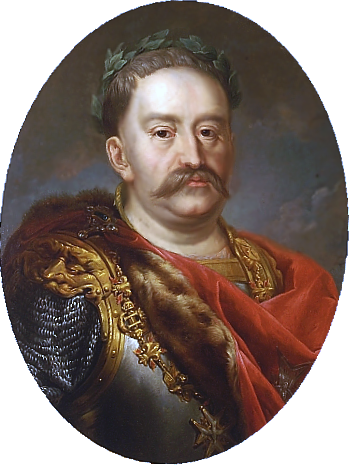
Sobieski

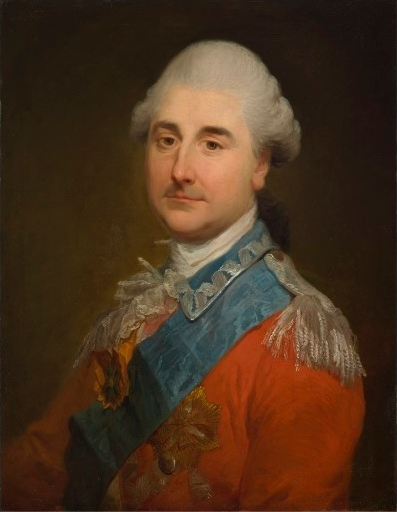
Stanisław August

== Assassins ==
- Leon Czolgosz, American assassin of American President William McKinley
- Ignacy Hryniewiecki, assassin of Tsar Alexander II of Russia
- Eligiusz Niewiadomski, modernist painter, art critic, assassin of Polish President Gabriel Narutowicz
- Janusz Waluś, assassin of Chris Hani
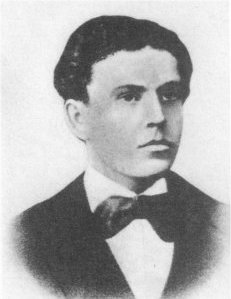
Hryniewiecki

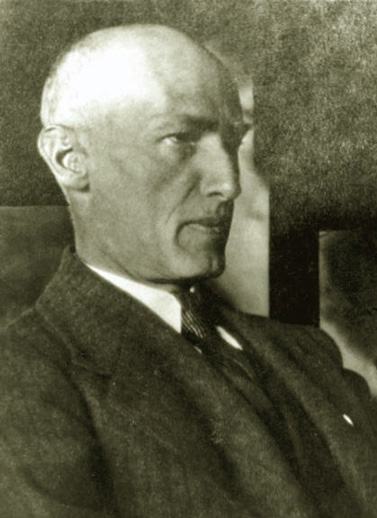
Niewiadomski

== Miscellany ==
- George Adamski, controversial ufologist
- Krystyna Chojnowska-Liskiewicz, sailor
- Franciszek Czapek, watchmaker
- Aleksander Doba, explorer who holds the record for the longest open-water kayak voyage ever made
- Michał Drzymała, resistance hero
- Piotr Gawryś, contract bridge champion
- Wincenty Gostkowski, watchmaker
- Halina Grabowski, war hero
- Barbara Hulanicki, fashion designer, founder of Biba
- Piotr Iwanicki, wheelchair dancing world champion
- Alicja Iwańska, resistance movement and anti-communist activist
- Marek Kamiński, adventure traveler
- Rutka Laskier, diarist, killed during the World War II Holocaust
- Piotr Naszarkowski, engraver
- Stefan Ossowiecki, psychic
- Stanisław Pietkiewicz, cartographer and geographer
- Feliks Rajmund Podkóliński, physician, soldier
- Ludwik Rajchman, bacteriologist, founder of UNICEF
- Czesław Słania, postage stamp and banknote engraver
- Renia Spiegel, diarist, killed during the World War II Holocaust, known as "the Polish Anne Frank"
- Stanisława Tomczyk, spiritualist medium, early 20th century
- Wilfrid Michael Voynich (Michał Habdank-Wojnicz, 1865–1930), Polish revolutionary and bibliophile remembered as the eponym of the mysterious Voynich manuscript
- Warren Winiarski, California winemaker
- Kuba Wojewódzki, journalist, television personality, drummer, comedian, and columnist
- Marie Elizabeth Zakrzewska, physician, pioneering female doctor in the United States
- Maciej Zien, fashion designer
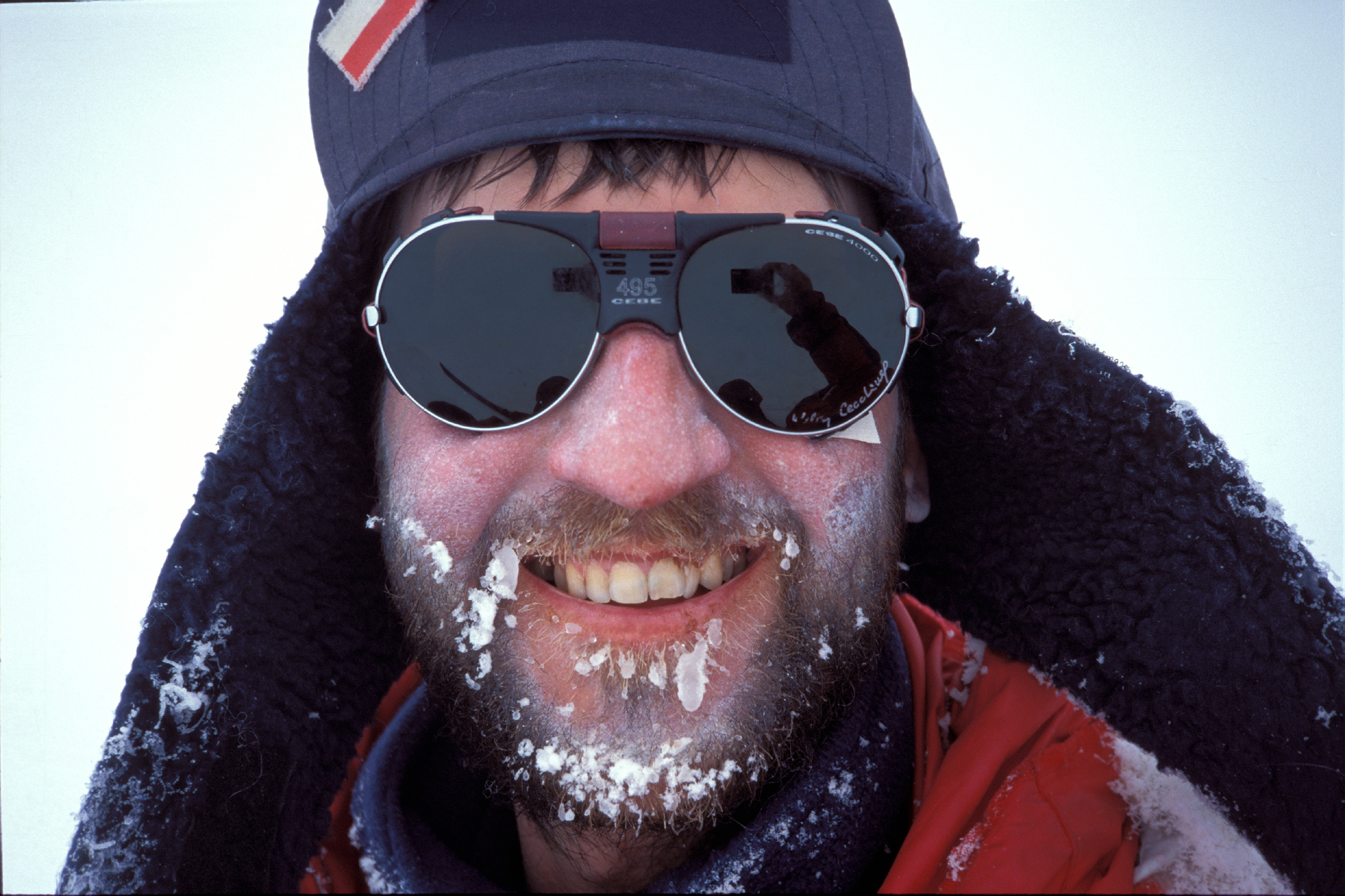
Kamiński

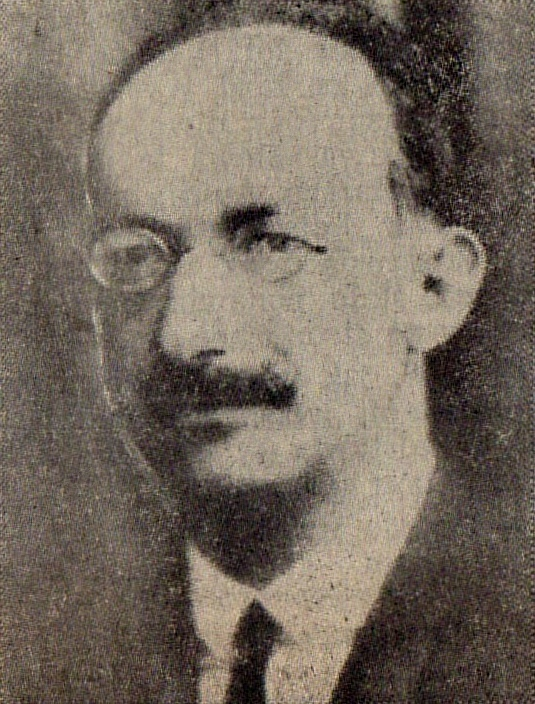
Rajchman

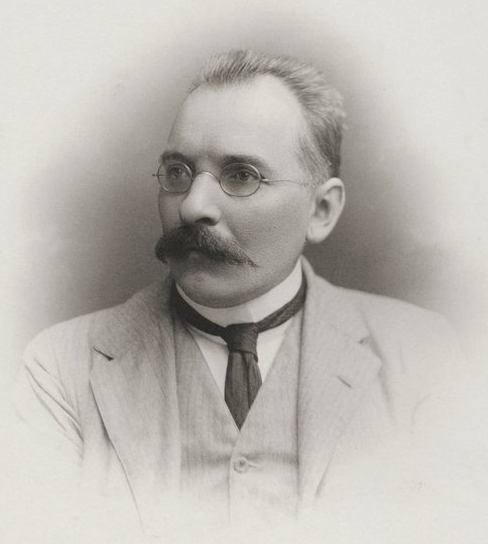
Voynich

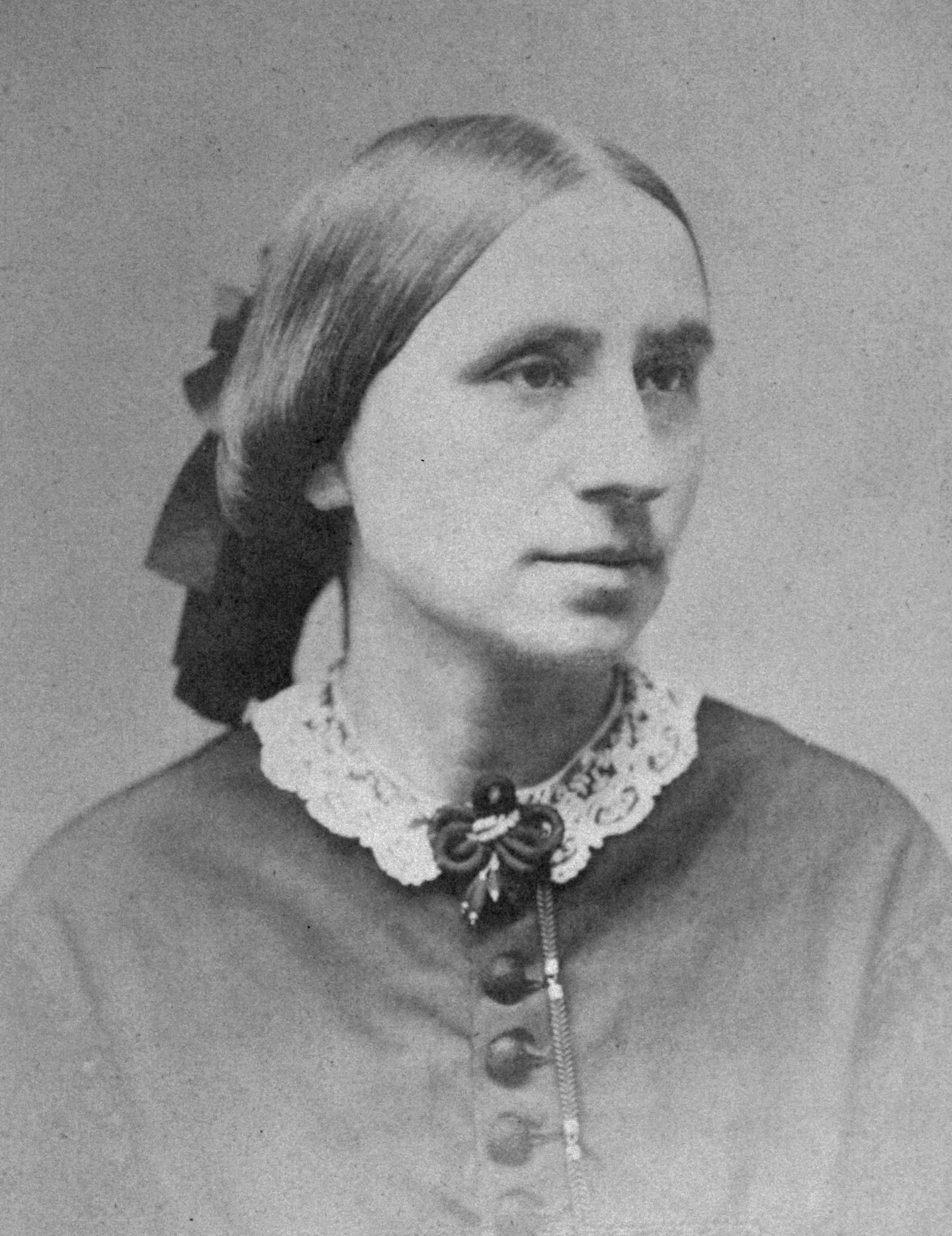
Zakrzewska

== Legendary persons ==
- Krakus, legendary prince and founder of Kraków
- Lech, legendary founder of the Polish nation
- Piast the Wheelwright (Piast Kołodziej), semi-legendary figure in prehistoric Poland (9th century); founder of the Piast dynasty
- Popiel, semi-legendary 9th-century ruler of the western Polans; last of the Popielids
- Lajkonik, a Kraków half-man-half-horse figure representing a Mongol invader, with his own festival after the feast of Corpus Christi
- Our Lady of Częstochowa (known also as "the Black Madonna"), foremost of Polish religious icons
- Abraham Prochownik, legendary Jewish figure, said to have been named prince of the western Polans after the death of Popiel in 842
- Sarmatians, ancient proto-Persian tribe that fed the idea of Sarmatism during the Polish–Lithuanian Commonwealth
- John Scolvus, semi-legendary sailor of the late 15th century
- Syrenka warszawska, legendary fresh-water mermaid said to have been rescued by Vistula fishermen. Iconic symbol of Warsaw
- Pan Twardowski, semi-legendary Faust-like sorcerer; in Polish legend, the first man on the Moon (in the 16th century)
- Janek Wiśniewski, freedom fighter; hero of 1970 Gdynia riots
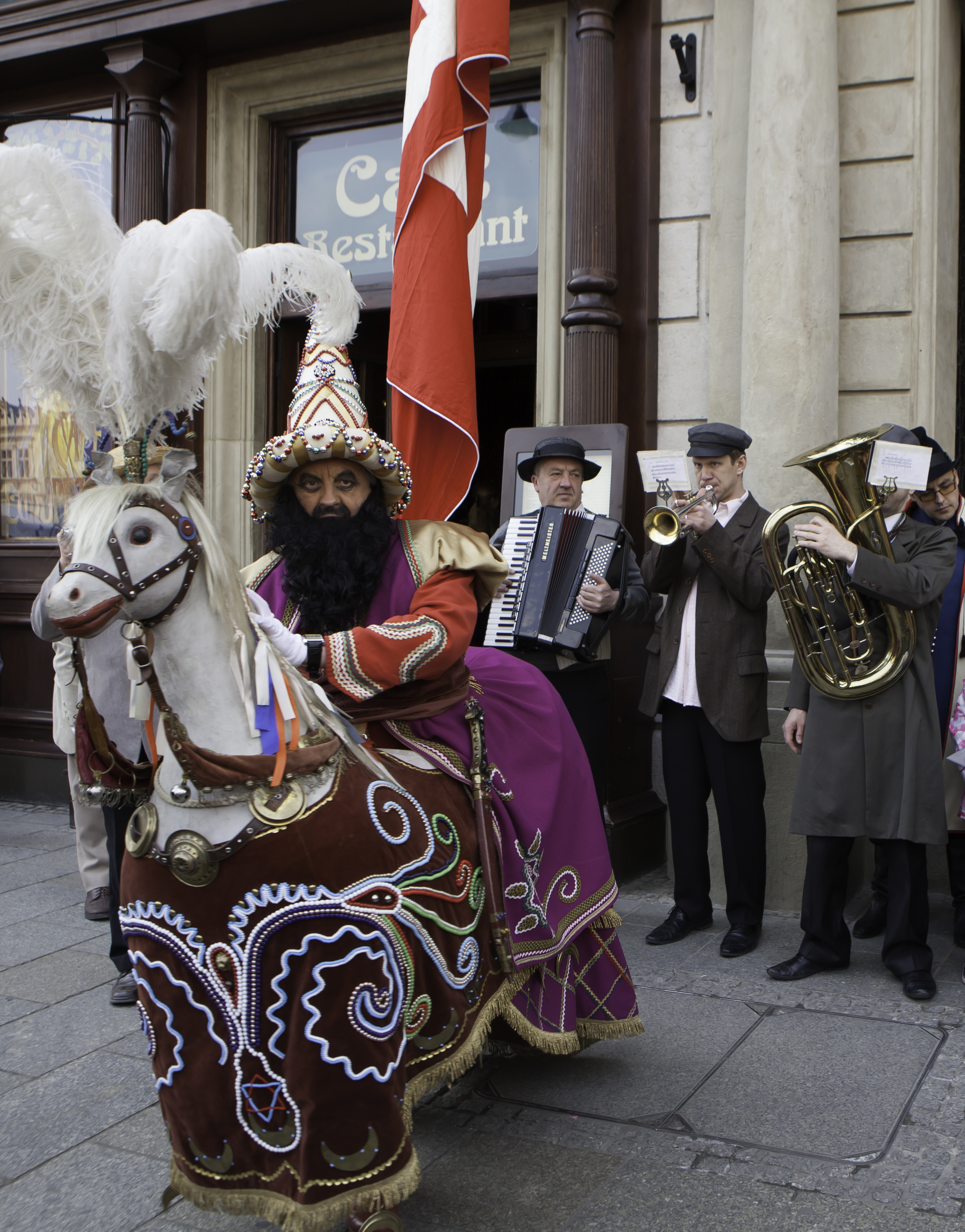
Lajkonik

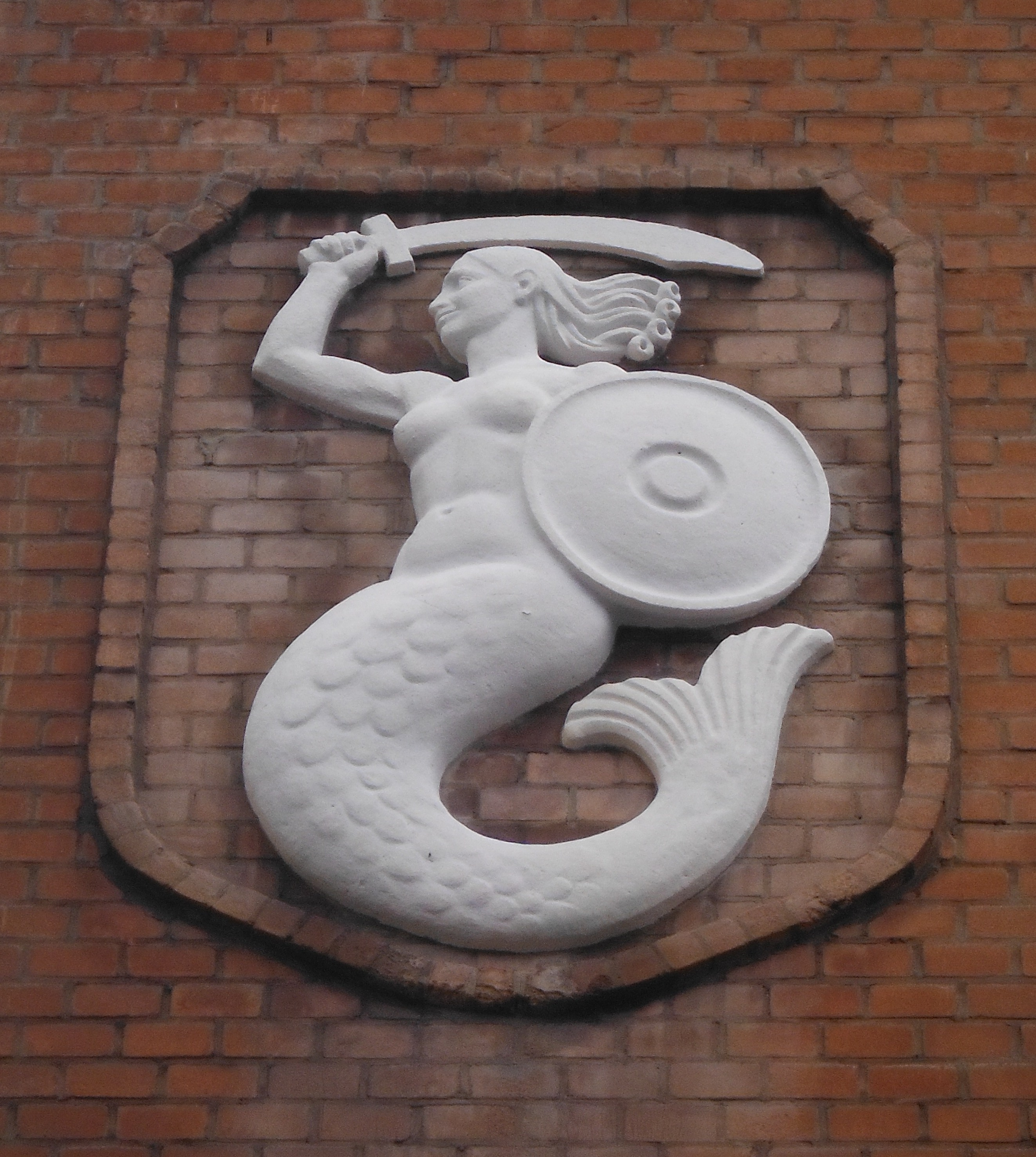
Syrenka

== Fictional characters ==
- Matteusz Andrzejewski, played by Jordan Renzo, a character in Class, a British science fiction drama programme, and a spin-off of the long-running programme Doctor Who
- Captain William Joseph B.J. Blazkowicz in Wolfenstein 3D
- Ernst Stavro Blofeld, a villain from the James Bond series of novels and films, created by Ian Fleming
- Bolek i Lolek, cartoon characters from a Polish children's TV animated comedy series
- Baba Jaga, Polish version of the forest-dwelling sorceress
- Balinski Wiktor, famous from the Polish legend "Chłopiec z dziwnym mózgiem"
- Waldemar Daninsky, wolfman in La Marca del Hombre Lobo
- Nicodemus Dyzma, in Tadeusz Dołęga-Mostowicz's novel The Career of Nicodemus Dyzma
- Jacob Jankowski, a character played by Robert Pattinson in a 2011 American romantic drama film Water for Elephants
- Marcin Jerek, Polish-born British professor and former CIA interrogator, in the TV series NCIS, played by W. Morgan Sheppard
- Dr. Judym, in Stefan Żeromski's novel Homeless People
- Kajko i Kokosz
- Florentyna Kane in The Prodigal Daughter and Shall We Tell the President?
- Commander Keen, grandson of B.J. Blazkowicz
- Hans Kloss (Captain Kloss), World War II secret agent in the Polish TV serial Stake larger than life
- Kordian
- Funky Koval, space detective
- Sugar "Kane" Kowalczyk, a singer of Polish descent played by Marilyn Monroe in Billy Wilder's 1959 romantic comedy film Some Like It Hot
- Kowalski, a penguin in the children's film Madagascar
- Stanley Kowalski, in Tennessee Williams' play A Streetcar Named Desire
- Detective Stanley Kowalski, Polish-American Chicago policeman in the 1990s Canadian television series Due South
- Walt Kowalski, Polish-American Korean War veteran and retired Ford worker, in Clint Eastwood's 2008 film Gran Torino
- Lucyna "Lucy" Kushinada, a netrunner of mixed Polish and Japanese descent in Cyberpunk: Edgerunners
- Ligia, heroine of Sienkiewicz's novel, Quo Vadis?
- Man of Iron, symbol of Solidarity and title of Wajda's film
- Koziołek Matołek, like the bear and the horse, the goat is part of Polish folklore, here in Kornel Makuszyński's rendition
- Mike Nomad (with Steve Roper), an American adventure comic strip (1936–2004)
- Count Olenski, estranged husband of Ellen Olenska in Edith Wharton's novel The Age of Innocence (1920)
- Pan Tadeusz, poetic distillation of Polish patriotism and nostalgia
- Roland "Prez" Pryzbylewski, in HBO's The Wire, went from police officer to school teacher
- Officer Eddie Pulaski in Grand Theft Auto: San Andreas
- Stefan "Steve" Radecki, a character played by Anton Walbrook in 1941 British war film Dangerous Moonlight
- Abel Rosnovski in Kane and Abel
- Pan Samochodzik, adventurer created by Zbigniew Nienacki
- Paweł i Gaweł, humorous morality tale about neighbour relations, a favourite children's poem
- Sasquatch (Dr. Walter Langkowski), Marvel superhero
- Sierotka Marysia, archetypal abandoned girl, "Little orphan Mary", living with dwarves
- Walter Sobchak, the "Polish Catholic" in the film The Big Lebowski
- Silk Spectre I & II, superheroines in Watchmen
- Stanislau, ace pilot in Blackhawk
- Stanisław Tarkowski (Staś), protagonist of young-adult novel In Desert and Wilderness by Nobel laureate Henryk Sienkiewicz
- Mieczysław Stilinski, also known as Stiles Stilinski, one of the main characters in American television series Teen Wolf broadcast on MTV and played by Dylan O'Brien
- Michael Stivic, in All in the Family
- Tadzio, a Polish boy (inspired by Władysław Moes) in Thomas Mann's novel Death in Venice as well as 1971 film adaptation of the same name by Luchino Visconti played by Björn Andrésen
- Ijon Tichy, main protagonist in several works of Stanisław Lem such as The Star Diaries, The Futurological Congress, Peace on Earth and Observation on the Spot
- Kasia Tomaszewski, played by Zofia Wichłacz, a character in World on Fire, a 2019 war drama miniseries broadcast on BBC One
- Maciej Tomczyk ala Lech Wałęsa, in the 1981 film Man of Iron, directed by Andrzej Wajda
- Pan Twardowski, a Faust-like figure of Polish legend, literature and film.
- Tytus, Romek i A'Tomek, Polish comic book heroes

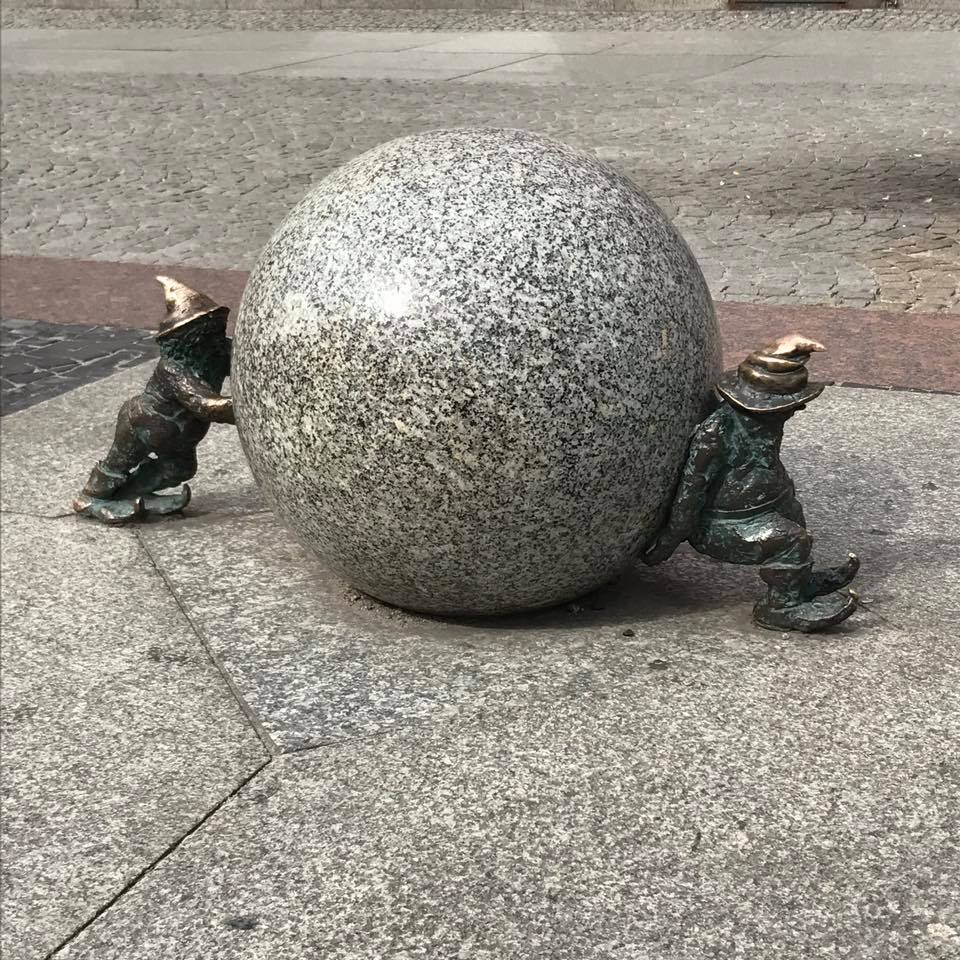
Wrocław's dwarfs

- Miś Uszatek, cartoon character
- Walter Koskiusko Waldowski, the "Painless Pole" in the film MASH
- Konrad Wallenrod, in the narrative poem by Adam Mickiewicz
- John Paul Wiggin (Jan Paweł Wieczorek) in the Ender's Game series
- Stanisław Wokulski, protagonist of Bolesław Prus' novel The Doll
- Stanley Thaddeus "Wojo" Wojciehowicz, played by Max Gail, in the American television sitcom Barney Miller
- Wrocław's dwarfs, brass manikins that first appeared on the city's pavements in 2005
- Piotr Zak, composer in a spoof BBC documentary
- Sophie Zawistowski, played by Meryl Streep, in Sophie's Choice based on a novel by William Styron

== Models ==
- Anna Anka (Anna Åberg, Anna Yeager), Swedish-American
- Małgosia Bela
- Alicja Bobrowska, Miss Polonia 1957
- Magdalena Frąckowiak
- Gila Golan
- Monika Jagaciak
- Anna Jagodzińska
- Joanna Krupa
- Anja Rubik
- Izabella Scorupco
- Ewa Sonnet, glamour model
- Sasha Strunin
- Kasia Struss
- Francys Sudnicka, Polish-Venezuelan model
- Aleksandra Szwed, actress, television presenter, singer, model
- Karolina Wydra, Polish-American model
- Iga Wyrwał
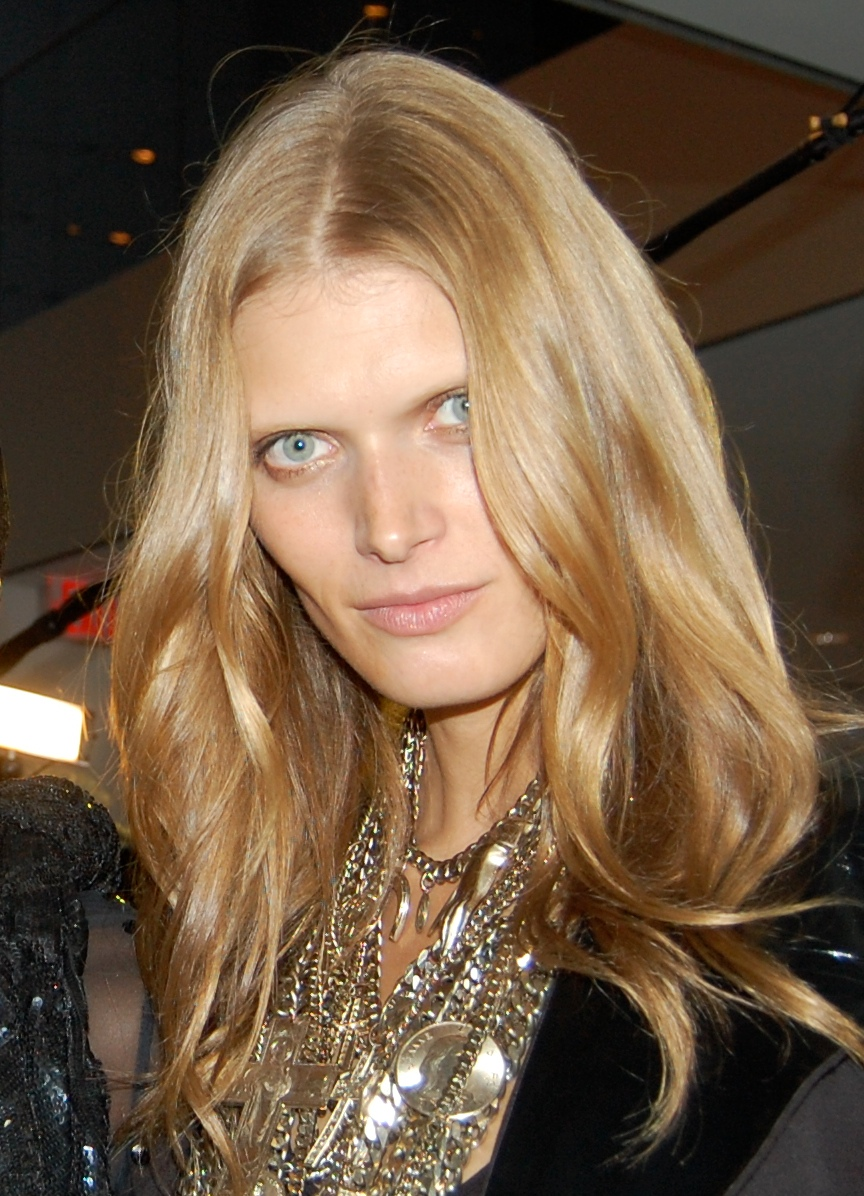
Bela

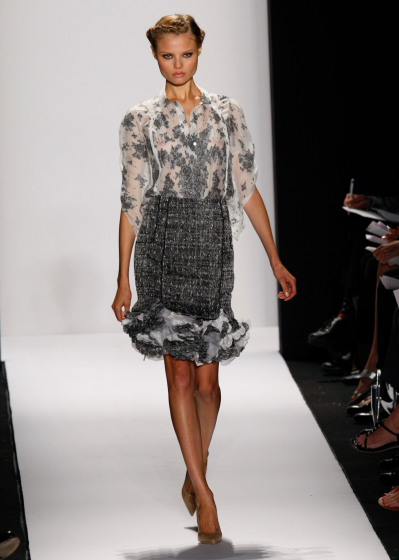
Frackowiak

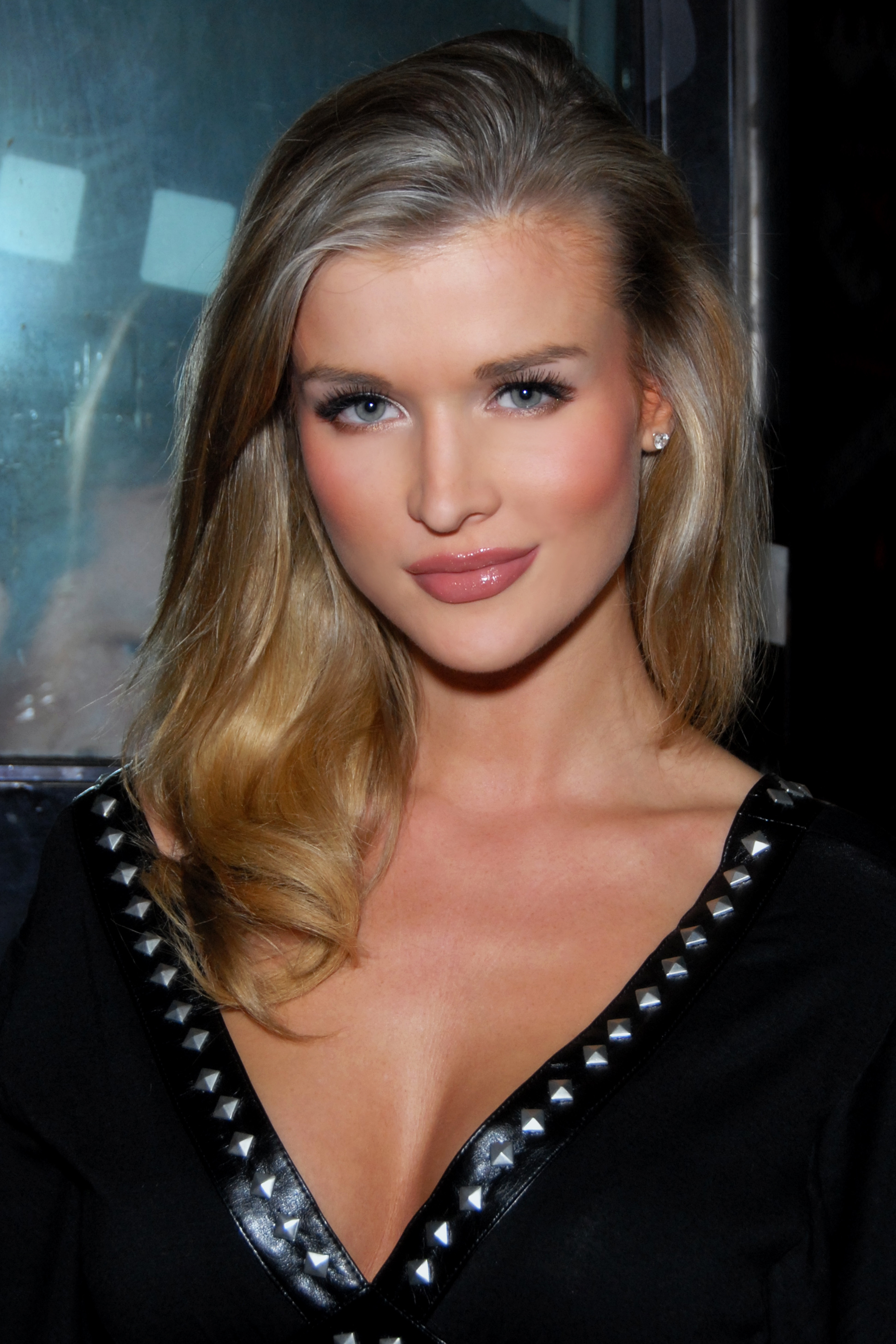
Krupa

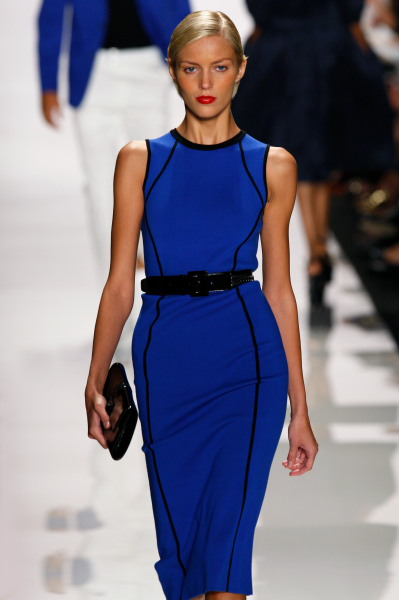
Rubik

== Athletics ==
- Andrzej Badeński (1943–2008), Olympic sprinter
- Iga Baumgart-Witan (born 1989), Olympic sprinter
- Konrad Bukowiecki (born 1997), Olympic shot putter
- Lidia Chojecka (born 1977), Olympic middle- and long-distance runner
- Jerzy Chromik (1931–1987), Olympic long-distance runner
- Teresa Ciepły (1937–2006), Olympic sprinter and hurdler
- Sofia Ennaoui (born 1995), Olympic middle-distance runner
- Paweł Fajdek (born 1989), Olympic hammer thrower
- Marian Foik (1933–2005), Olympic sprinter
- Wioletta Frankiewicz (born 1977), steeplechaser
- Halina Górecka (born 1938), Polish and German Olympic sprinter
- Piotr Haczek (born 1977), Olympic sprinter
- Michał Haratyk (born 1992), Olympic shot putter
- Zdzisław Hoffmann (born 1959), Olympic triple jumper
- Barbara Janiszewska (1936–2000), Olympic sprinter
- Michel Jazy (1936–2024), French Olympic middle- and long-distance runner
- Ilana Karaszyk (born 1938), Israeli Olympic sprinter and long jumper
- Ewa Kłobukowska (born 1946), Olympic sprinter
- Władysław Komar (1940–1998), Olympic champion shot putter
- Halina Konopacka (1900–1989), Polish-American Olympic champion discus thrower
- Robert Korzeniowski (born 1968), Olympic champion racewalker
- Władysław Kozakiewicz (born 1953), Lithuanian-born Polish Olympic champion pole vaulter
- Łukasz Krawczuk (born 1989), Olympic sprinter
- Elżbieta Krzesińska (1934–2015), Olympic champion long jumper
- Jakub Krzewina (born 1989), Olympic sprinter
- Zdzisław Krzyszkowiak (1929–2003), Olympic champion steeplechaser
- Adam Kszczot (born 1989), Olympic middle-distance runner
- Wacław Kuchar (1897–1981), athlete
- Janusz Kusociński (1907–1940), Olympic champion long-distance runner; murdered by the Nazis
- Maria Kwaśniewska (1913–2007), Olympic javelin thrower
- Marcin Lewandowski (born 1987), Olympic middle-distance runner
- Tomasz Majewski (born 1981), Olympic champion shot putter
- Piotr Małachowski (born 1983), Olympic discus thrower
- Wiesław Maniak (1938–1982), Olympic sprinter
- Bronisław Malinowski (1951–1981), Olympic champion steeplechaser
- Robert Maćkowiak (born 1970), Olympic sprinter
- Tamara Metal (1933–2022), Israeli Olympic high jumper and long jumper, and captain of the Israel women's national basketball team
- Józef Noji (1909–1943), Olympic long-distance runner, murdered in Auschwitz concentration camp
- Rafał Omelko (born 1989), Olympic sprinter
- Wanda Panfil (born 1959), Olympic long-distance runner
- Artur Partyka (born 1969), Olympic high jumper
- Edmund Piątkowski (1936–2016), Olympic discus thrower
- Marek Plawgo (born 1981), Olympic hurdler and sprinter
- Myer Prinstein (1878–1925), Polish-American Olympic champion long-jumper and triple-jumper
- Monika Pyrek (born 1980), Olympic pole vaulter
- Anna Rogowska (born 1981), Olympic pole vaulter
- Tadeusz Rut (1931–2002), Olympic hammer thrower
- Piotr Rysiukiewicz (born 1974), Olympic sprinter
- Edward Sarul (born 1958), shot putter
- Janusz Sidło (1933–1993), Olympic javelin thrower
- Kamila Skolimowska (1982–2009), Olympic champion hammer thrower
- Irena Szewińska (1946–2018), Olympic champion sprinter
- Józef Szmidt (1935–2024), Olympic champion triple jumper
- Ewa Swoboda (born 1997), Olympic sprinter
- Tadeusz Ślusarski (1950–1998), Olympic champion pole vaulter
- Justyna Święty-Ersetic (born 1992), Olympic champion sprinter
- Marcin Urbaś (born 1976), Olympic sprinter
- Jadwiga Wajs (1912–1990), Olympic discus thrower
- Stanisława Walasiewicz (1911–1980), Polish-American Olympic champion sprinter
- Jan Werner (1946–2014), Olympic sprinter
- Anita Włodarczyk (born 1985), Olympic champion hammer thrower
- Paweł Wojciechowski (born 1989), Olympic pole vaulter
- Marian Woronin (born 1956), Olympic sprinter
- Jacek Wszoła (born 1956), Olympic champion high jumper
- Karol Zalewski (born 1993), Olympic champion sprinter
- Kazimierz Zimny (1935–2022), Olympic long-distance runner
- Szymon Ziółkowski (born 1976), Olympic champion hammer thrower
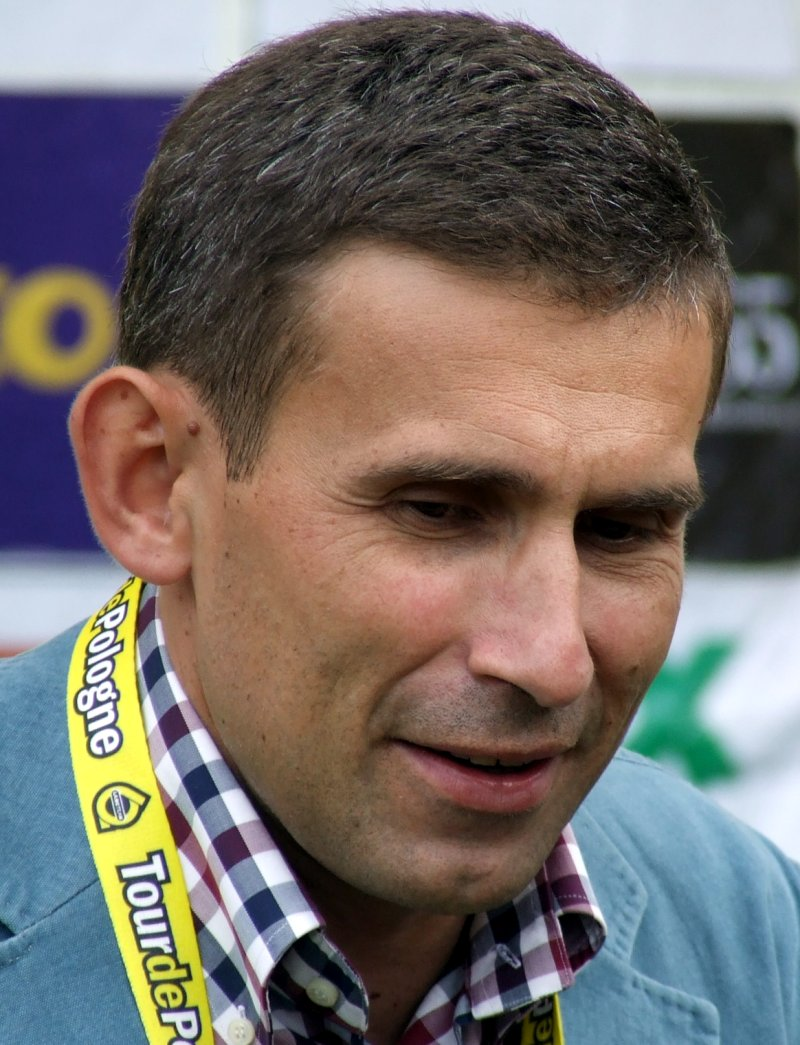
R. Korzeniowski

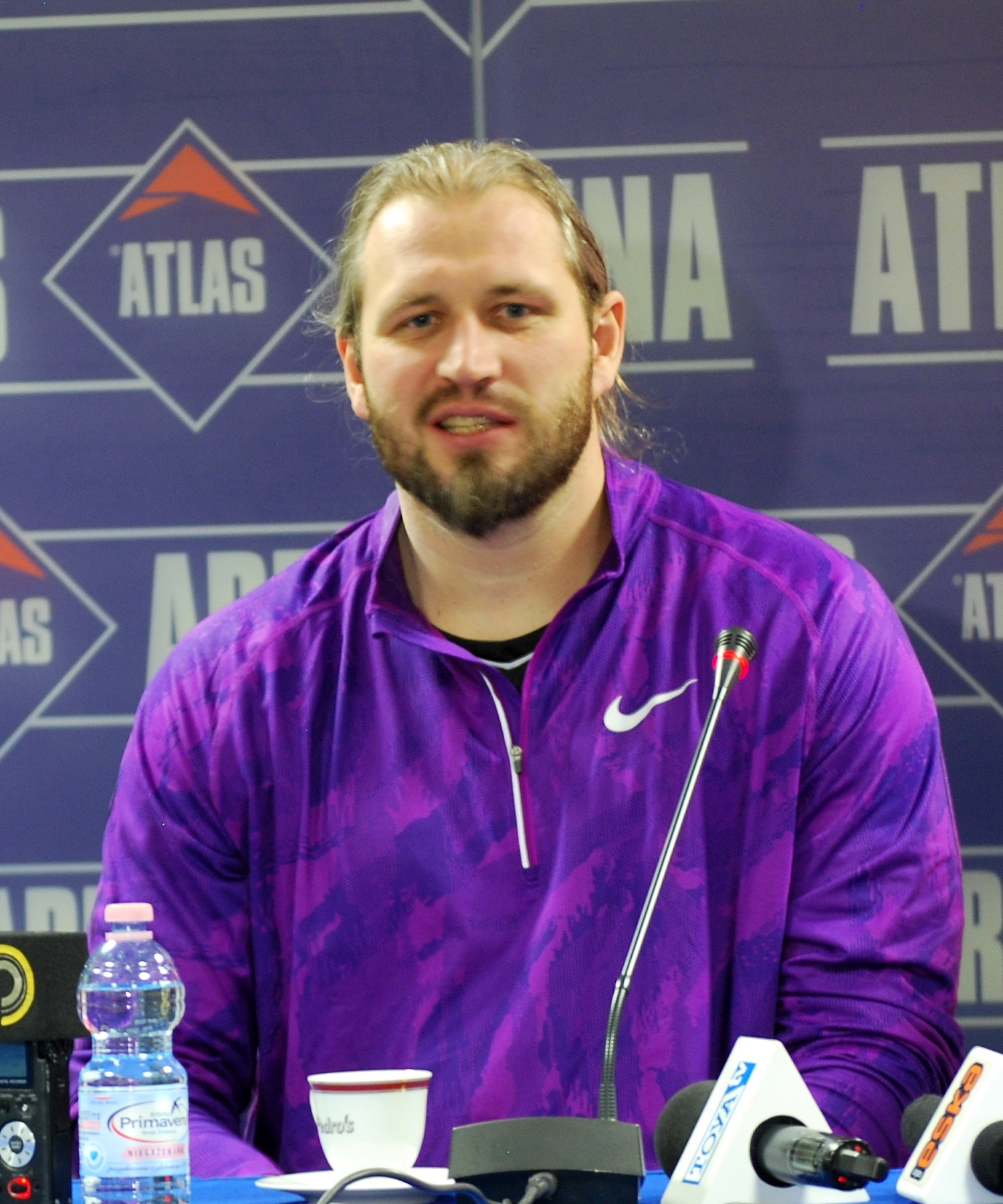
Majewski

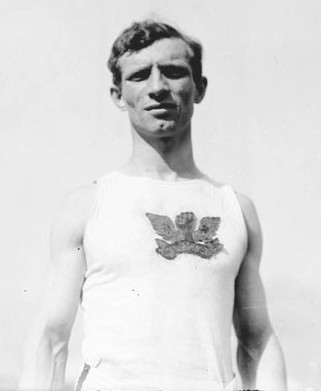
Prinstein

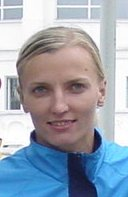
Rogowska

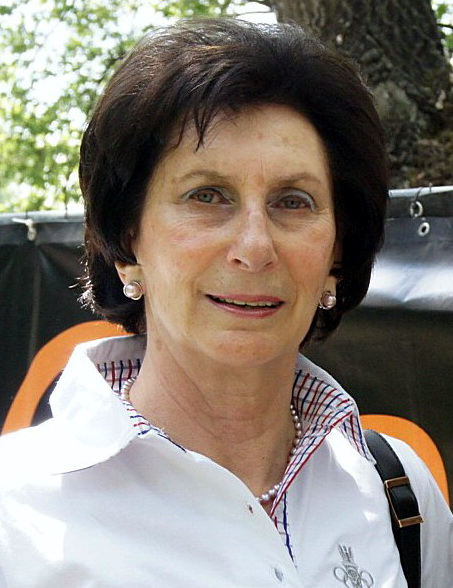
Szewińska

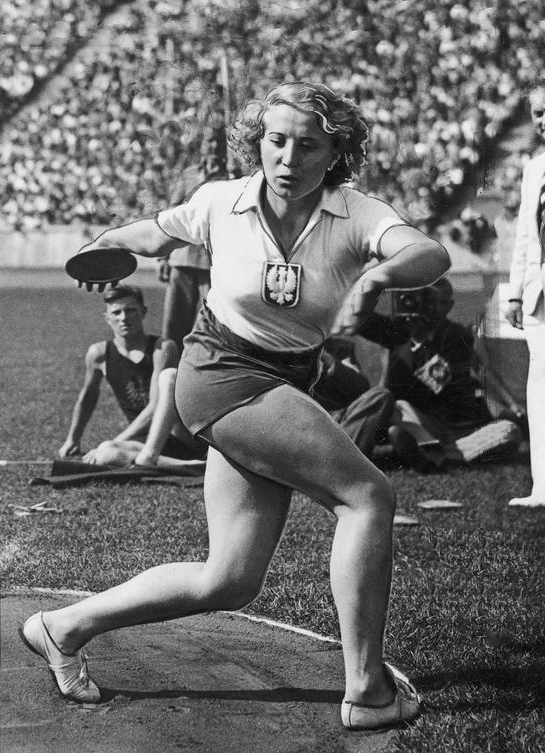
Wajs

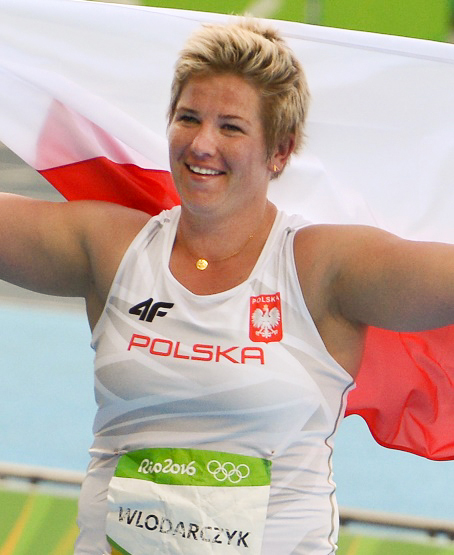
Włodarczyk

== Baseball ==
- Moe Drabowsky (1935–2006), Polish-born American baseball player
- Bill Mazeroski (born 1936), American baseball player, Hall of Fame
- Stan Musial (1920–2013), American baseball player, Hall of Fame
- Tom Paciorek (born 1946), American baseball player

== Basketball ==
- Aleksander Balcerowski (born 2000), basketball player
- Dardan Berisha (born 1988), Kosovan-Polish basketball player
- Oded Brandwein (born 1988), Israeli-Polish basketball player
- Aaron Cel (born 1987), French-Polish basketball player
- Olek Czyż (born 1990), basketball player
- Margo Dydek (1974–2011), basketball player, FIBA Hall of Fame
- Filip Dylewicz (born 1980), basketball player
- Aleksandra Gajewska (born 1989), politician, businessperson, basketball player
- Tomasz Gielo (born 1993), basketball player
- Marcin Gortat (born 1984), Polish-American National Basketball Association (NBA), Los Angeles Clippers player
- Karol Gruszecki (born 1989), basketball player
- Adam Hrycaniuk (born 1984), basketball player
- Steve Javie (born 1955), American NBA referee
- Przemek Karnowski (born 1993), basketball player
- Thomas Kelati (born 1982), American-Polish basketball player
- Mateusz Kostrzewski (born 1989), basketball player
- Łukasz Koszarek (born 1984), basketball player
- Damian Kulig (born 1987), basketball player
- Maciej Lampe (born 1985), Polish-Swedish NBA basketball player
- David Logan (born 1982), American-born Polish basketball player
- Dominik Olejniczak (born 1996), basketball player
- Mateusz Ponitka (born 1993), basketball player
- A.J. Slaughter (born 1987), Polish-American basketball player
- Jeremy Sochan (born 2003), Polish-American NBA player, San Antonio Spurs
- Michał Sokołowski (born 1992), basketball player
- Krzysztof Szubarga (born 1984), basketball player
- Adam Waczyński (born 1989), basketball player
- Adam Wójcik (1970–2017), basketball player
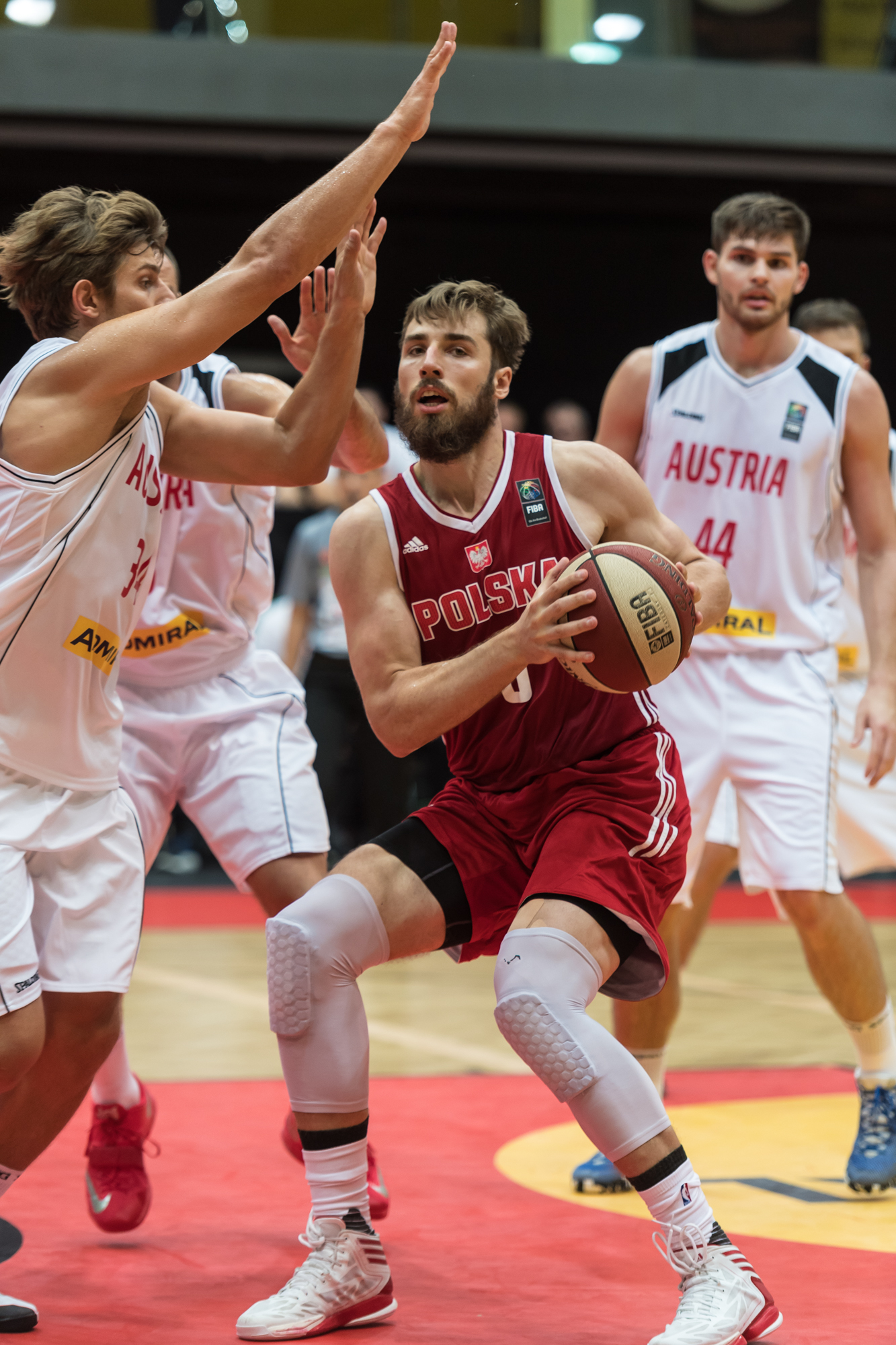
Czyż

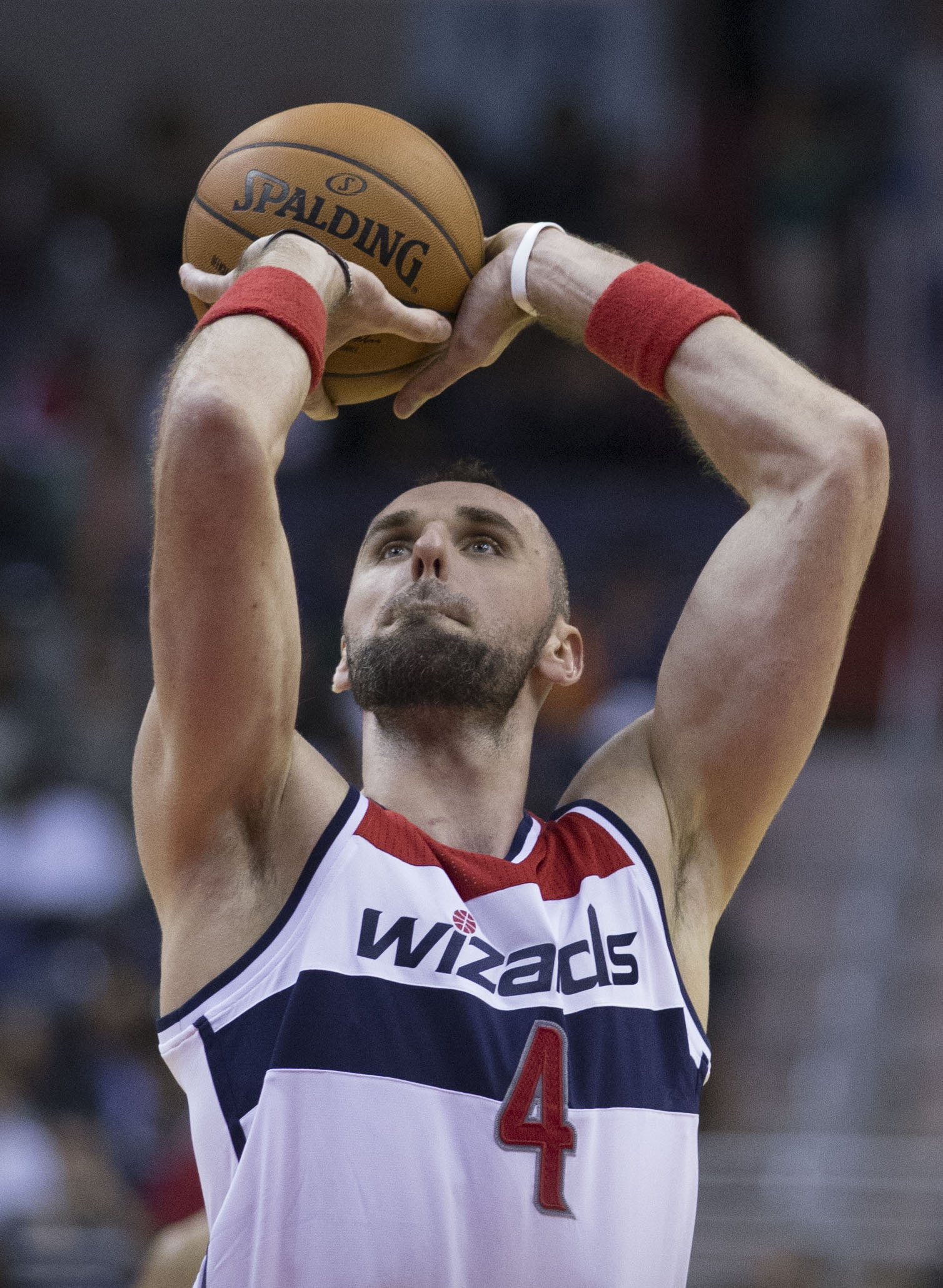
Gortat

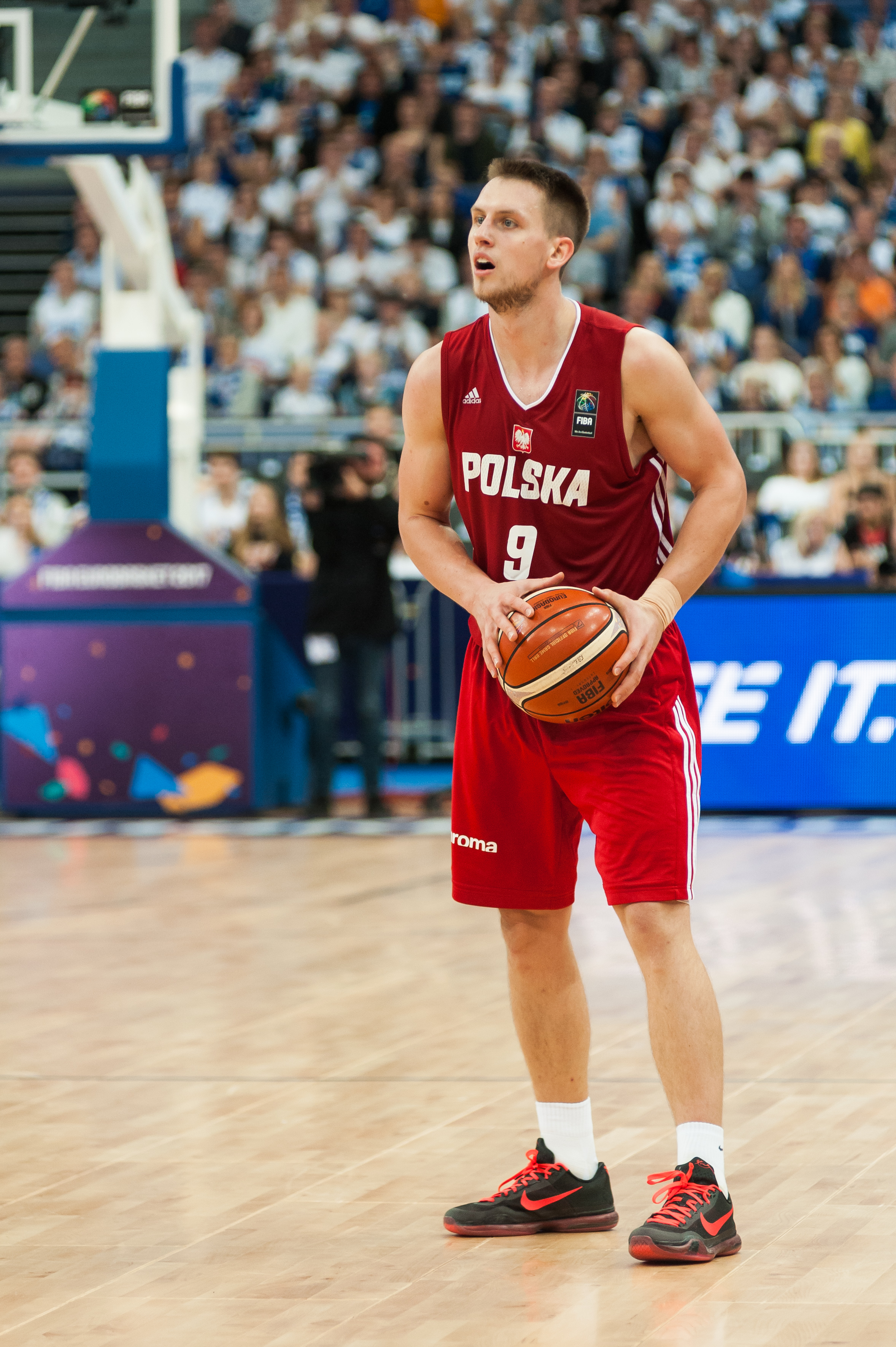
Ponitka

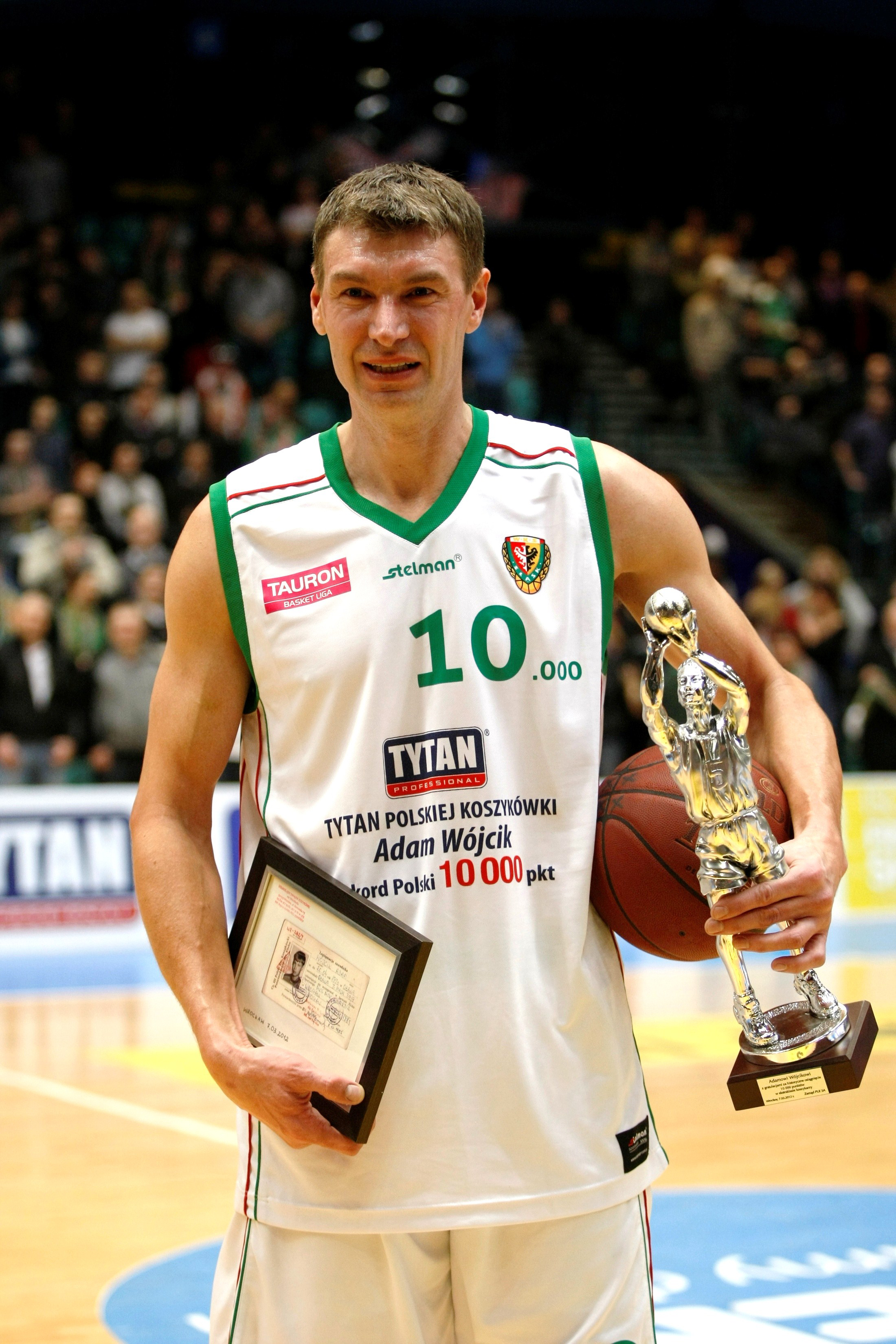
Wójcik

== Boxing ==
- Tomasz Adamek
- Aleksy Antkiewicz
- Joe Choynski
- Zygmunt Chychła
- Leszek Drogosz
- Charley Goldman, International Boxing Hall of fame
- Andrzej Gołota
- Janusz Gortat
- Józef Grudzień
- Marian Kasprzyk
- Jerzy Kulej
- Dariusz Michalczewski
- Kazimierz Paździor
- Zbigniew Pietrzykowski
- Jerzy Rybicki
- Feliks Stamm, coach
- Jan Szczepański
- Artur Szpilka
- Henryk Średnicki
- Izu Ugonoh
- Krzysztof Włodarczyk
- Tony Zale
- Janusz Zarenkiewicz
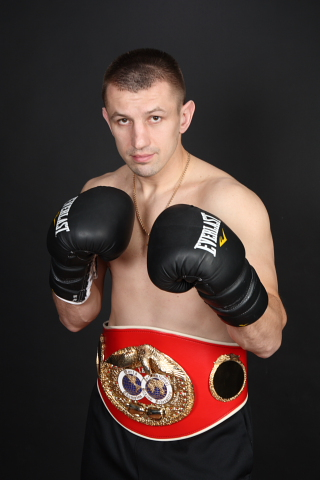
Adamek

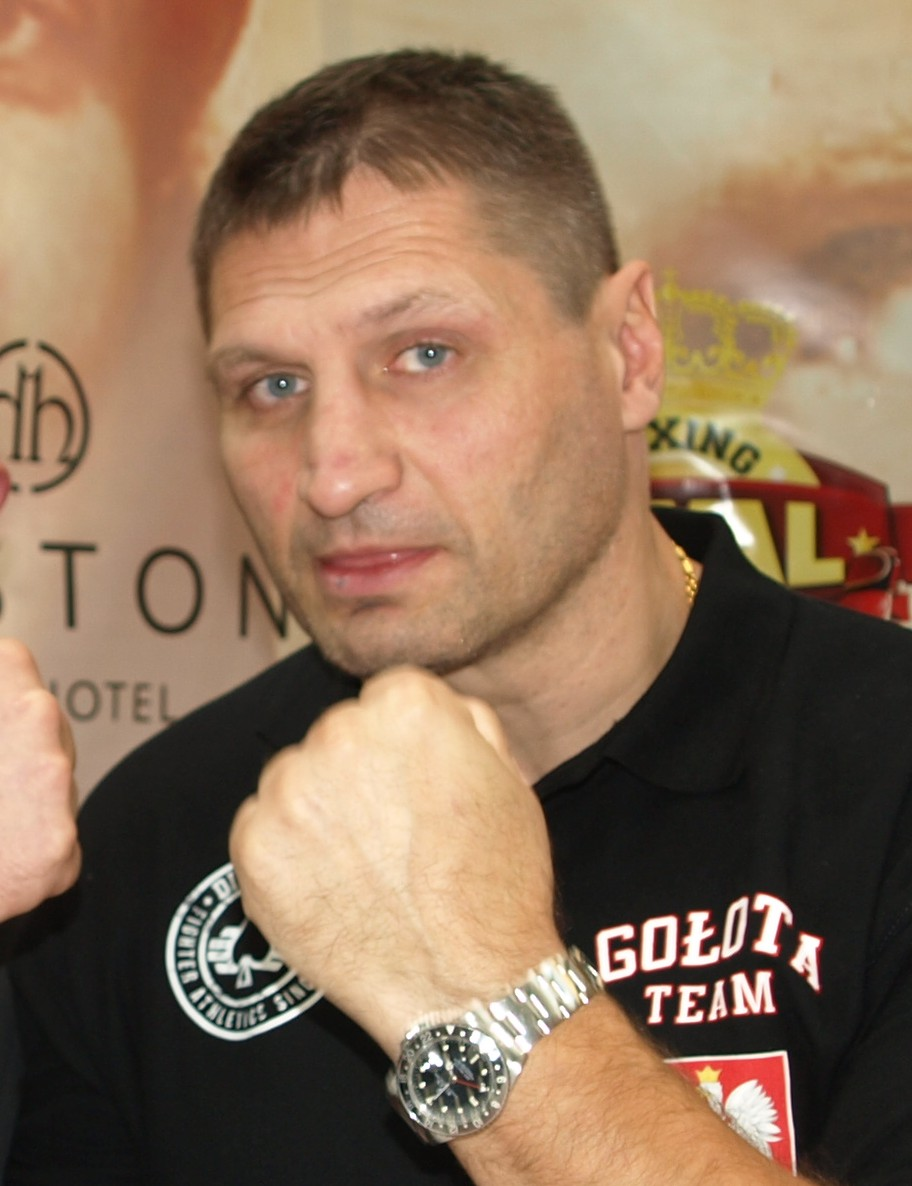
Gołota

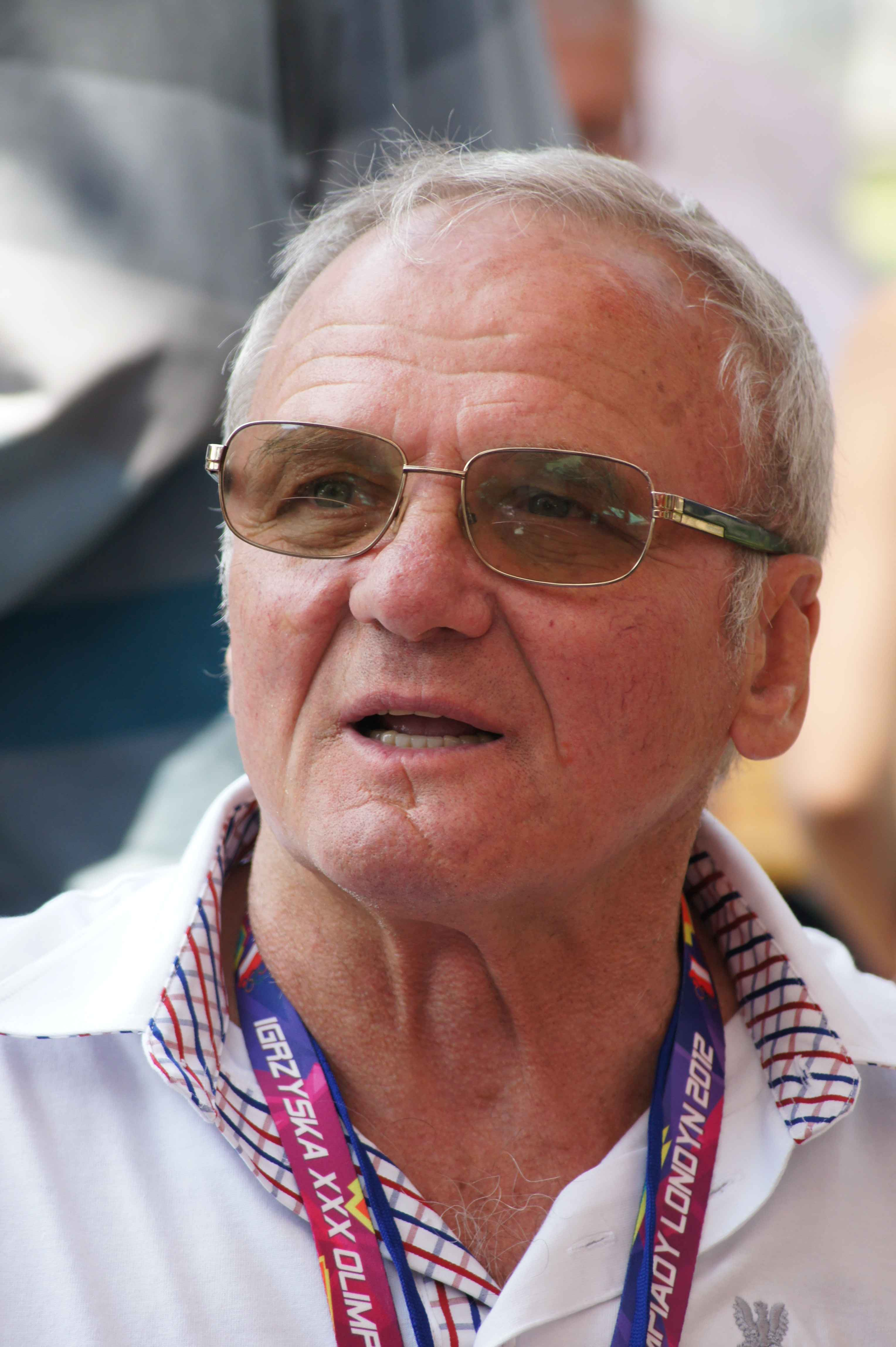
Kulej

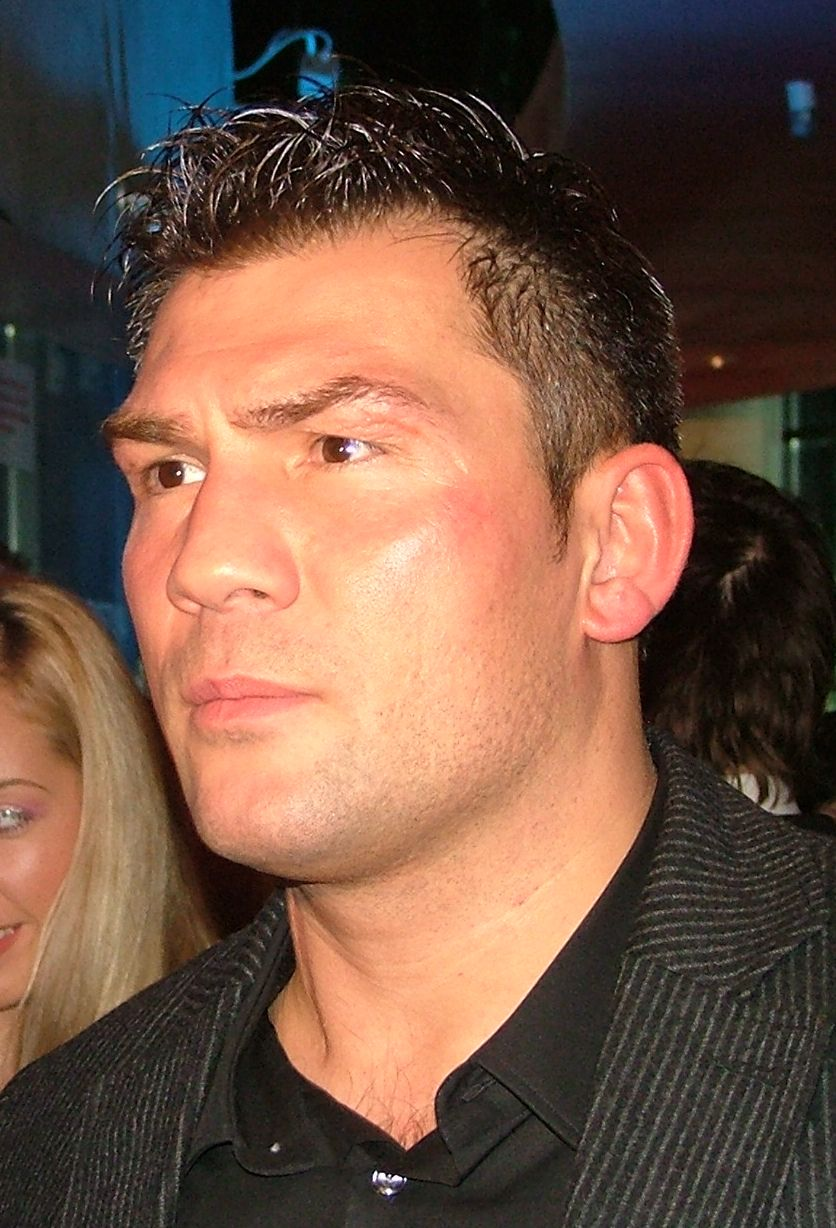
Michalczewski

== Checkers ==
- Natalia Sadowska (born 1991)

== Chess ==
- Izak Aloni (1905–1985), Polish-Israeli chess master
- Izaak Appel (1905–missing), chess master
- Arnold Aurbach (1888–1952), Polish-French chess master
- Zdzisław Belsitzmann (1890–1920), chess master
- Abram Blass (1895–1971), Polish-Israeli chess master
- Agnieszka Brustman (b. 1962), woman chess grandmaster
- Oscar Chajes (1873–1928)
- Joseph Cukierman (1900–1941), Polish-born French grandmaster
- Hieronim Czarnowski (1834–1902), Polish-French chess master
- Moshe Czerniak (1910–1984), Polish-Israeli International Master
- Arthur Dake (1910–2000), American born to Polish parents, grandmaster
- Dawid Daniuszewski (1885–1944), chess master
- Józef Dominik (1894–1920), chess master
- Jan-Krzysztof Duda (b. 1998), grandmaster
- Arthur Dunkelblum (1906–1979), Polish-Belgian International Master
- Boruch Israel Dyner (1903–1979), Polish-Belgian-Israeli chess master
- Hanna Ereńska (b. 1946), woman grandmaster
- Samuel Factor (1883–1949), Polish-American chess master
- Alexander Flamberg (1880–1926), chess master
- Henryk Friedman (1903–1942), chess master
- Achilles Frydman (1905–1940), chess player, died in a Nazi concentration camp
- Paulino Frydman (1905–1982), Polish-Argentinean chess master
- Regina Gerlecka (1913–1983), chess player
- Edward Gerstenfeld (1915–1943), chess master, killed in the Holocaust
- Yehuda Gruenfeld (born 1956), grandmaster
- Izaak Grynfeld (1912-?), later known as Ignacy Branicki, Polish-born Israeli chess master
- Róża Herman (1902–1995), Woman International Master
- Krystyna Hołuj-Radzikowska, Woman International Master
- Chaim Janowski (1868–1935), chess master
- Dawid Janowski (1868–1927), chess player
- Max Judd (1851–1906), American chess player
- Bernhard Kagan (1866–1932), German chess player
- Stanisław Kohn (1895–1940), chess master
- George Koltanowski (1903–2000), American International Master born in Belgium to a Polish-Jewish family, set the world's blindfold record by playing 34 chess games simultaneously while blindfolded, and set a record for playing 56 consecutive blindfold games at ten seconds per move (winning 50, drawing 6).
- Henrijeta Konarkowska-Sokolov (b. 1938), Polish-Serbian chess master
- Michał Krasenkow (b. 1963), Russian-born grandmaster, moved to Poland in 1992
- Leon Kremer (1901–1941), chess master
- Adam Kuligowski (b. 1955), grandmaster
- Abraham Kupchik (1892–1970), American chess master
- Salo Landau (1903–1943), Dutch chess player, died in a Nazi concentration camp
- Edward Lasker (1885–1981), German-American chess International Master
- Paul Saladin Leonhardt (1877–1934), German chess master
- Grigory Levenfish (1889–1961), Soviet grandmaster
- Moishe Lowtzky (1881–1940), Ukrainian–Polish chess master, died in a Nazi concentration camp
- Bartłomiej Macieja (b. 1977), grandmaster
- Kazimierz Makarczyk (1901–1972), chess master
- Kalikst Morawski (1859–1939), chess master
- Stasch Mlotkowski (1881–1943), American chess master, born in the US to Polish parents
- Piotr Murdzia (b. 1975), chess International Master
- Miguel Najdorf (1910–1997), Polish-Argentine grandmaster
- Menachem Oren (1903–1962), Polish-born Israeli chess player
- Julius Perlis (1880–1913), Austrian chess player
- Karol Piltz (1903–1939), chess master
- Oskar Piotrowski, chess master
- Kazimierz Plater (1915–2004), International Master
- Henryk Pogorieły (1908–1943), chess master, murdered in the Holocaust
- Ignatz von Popiel (1863–1941), Polish-Ukrainian chess player
- Artur Popławski (1860–1918), chess master
- Dawid Przepiórka (1880–1940), won the first Polish championship, murdered in the Holocaust
- Iweta Rajlich (b. 1981), International Master and Woman Grandmaster
- Teodor Regedziński (1894–1954), chess master
- Samuel Reshevsky (1911–1992), Polish-American grandmaster
- Samuel Rosenthal (1837–1902), Polish-born French chess player
- Gersz Rotlewi (1889–1920), chess master
- Akiba Rubinstein (1880–1961), Polish-Belgian International Grandmaster
- Gersz Salwe (1862–1920), chess master
- Włodzimierz Schmidt (b. 1943), grandmaster
- Leon Schwartzmann (1887–1942), Polish–French chess master, murdered in Auschwitz concentration camp
- Stanislaus Sittenfeld (1865–1902), Polish–French chess master
- Monika Soćko (b. 1978), grandmaster and Woman Grandmaster
- Franciszek Sulik (1908–1997), Polish-Australian chess master
- Bogdan Śliwa (1922–2003), International Master
- Dariusz Świercz (b. 1994), Polish-American grandmaster
- Gedali Szapiro (Grzegorz Szapiro; 1929–1972), chess master
- Savielly Tartakower (1887–1956), Polish-French International Grandmaster
- Jean Taubenhaus (1850–1919), Polish–born French chess master
- Oscar Tenner (1880–1948), Poland-born German–American chess master
- Vitaly Tseshkovsky (1944–2011), Russian grandmaster
- Alexander Wagner (1868–1942)
- Szymon Winawer (1838–1919), chess player
- Radosław Wojtaszek (b. 1987), grandmaster
- Aleksander Wojtkiewicz (1963–2006), Polish-American grandmaster
- Daniel Yanofsky (1925–2000), Canadian grandmaster
- Józef Żabiński (1860–1928), chess master
- Johannes Zukertort (1842–1888), Polish-born British-German chess master
- Adolf Zytogorski (c. 1811/1812–1882), Polish-British chess master
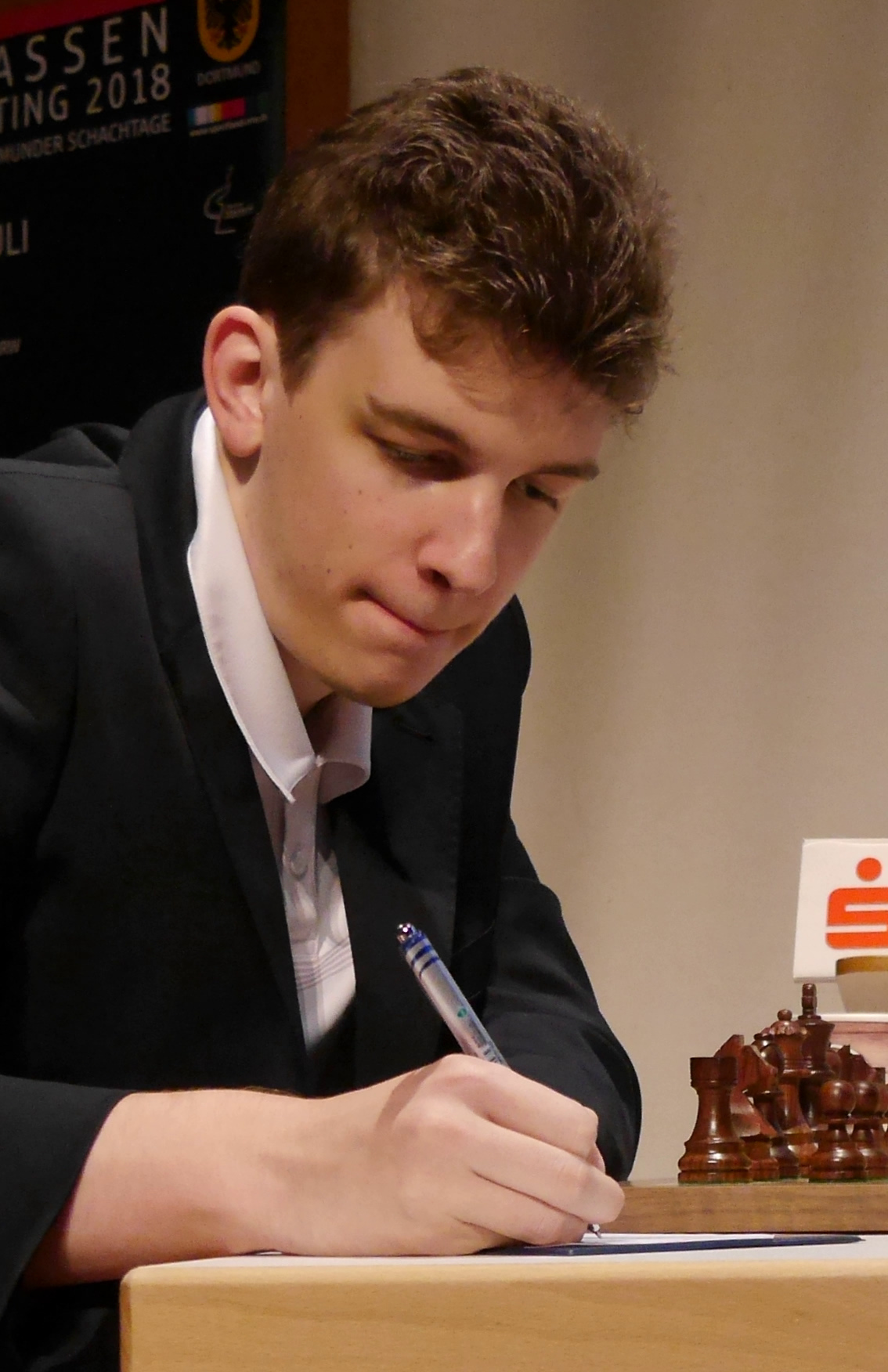
Duda

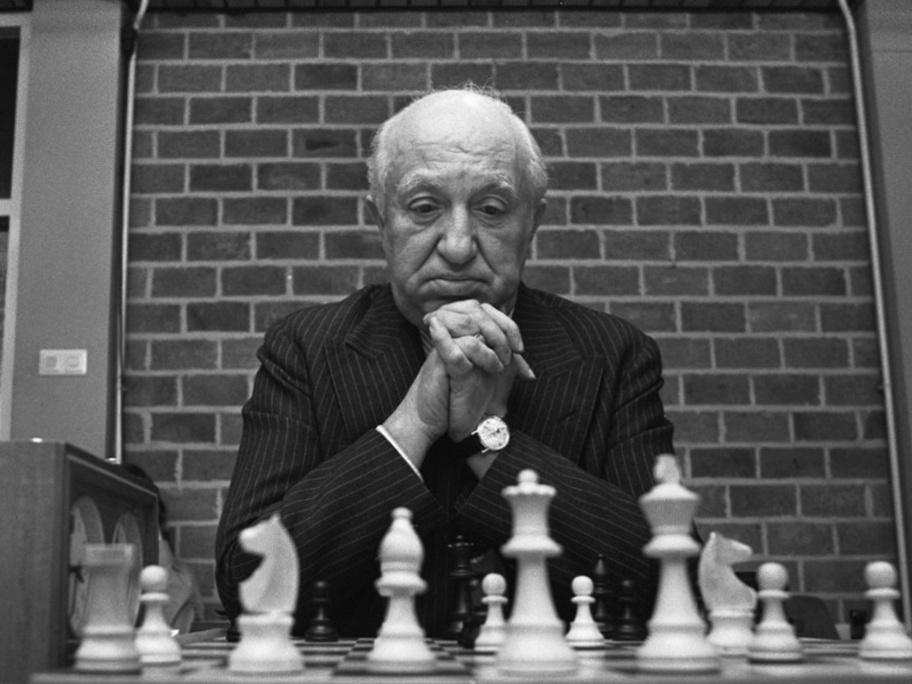
Najdorf

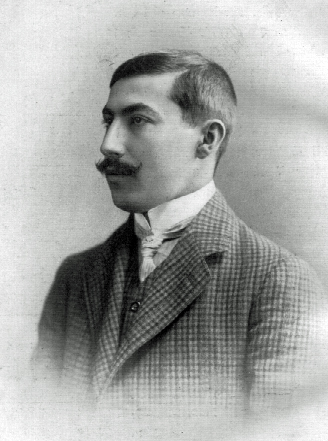
Rubinstein

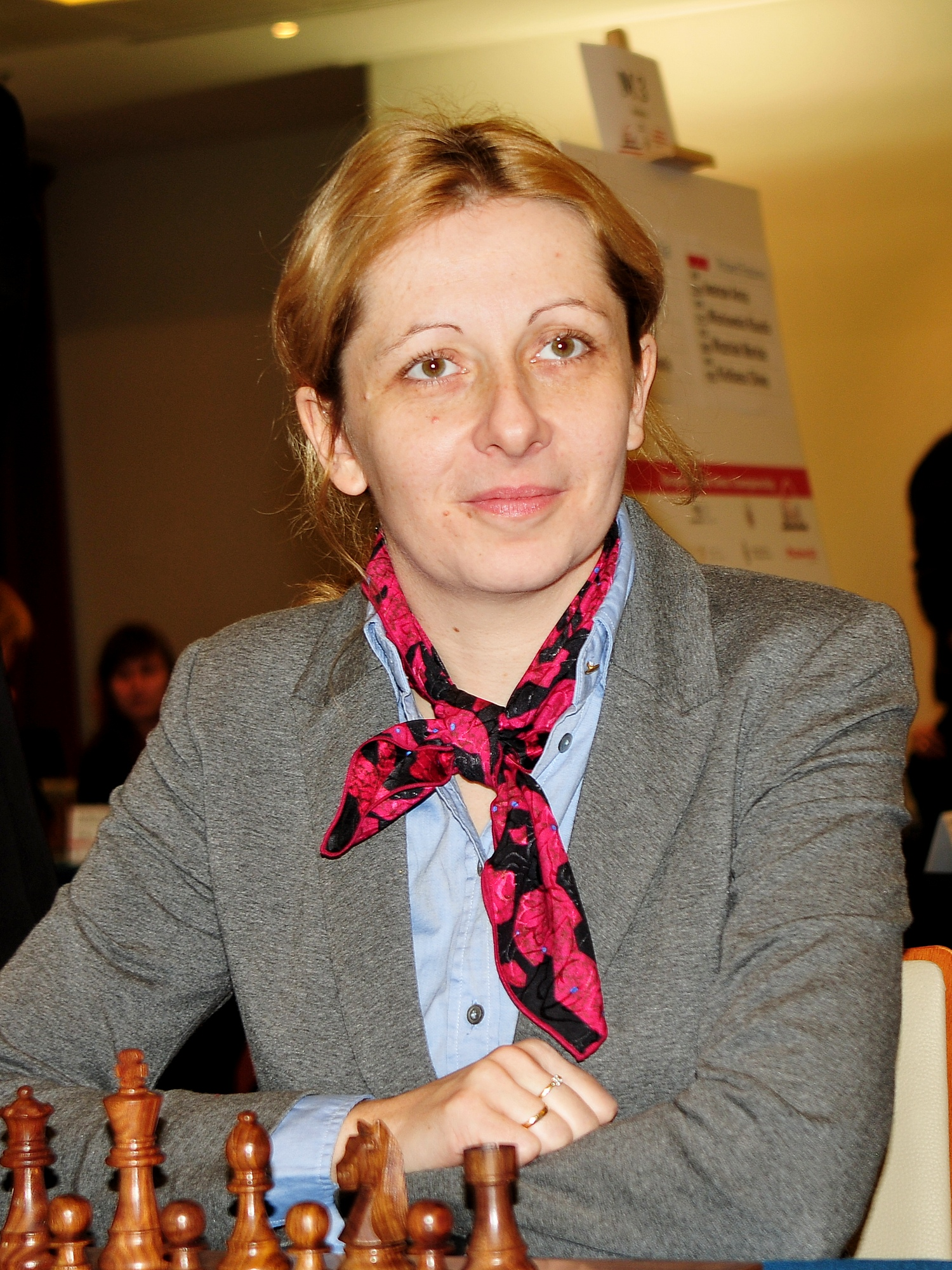
Soćko

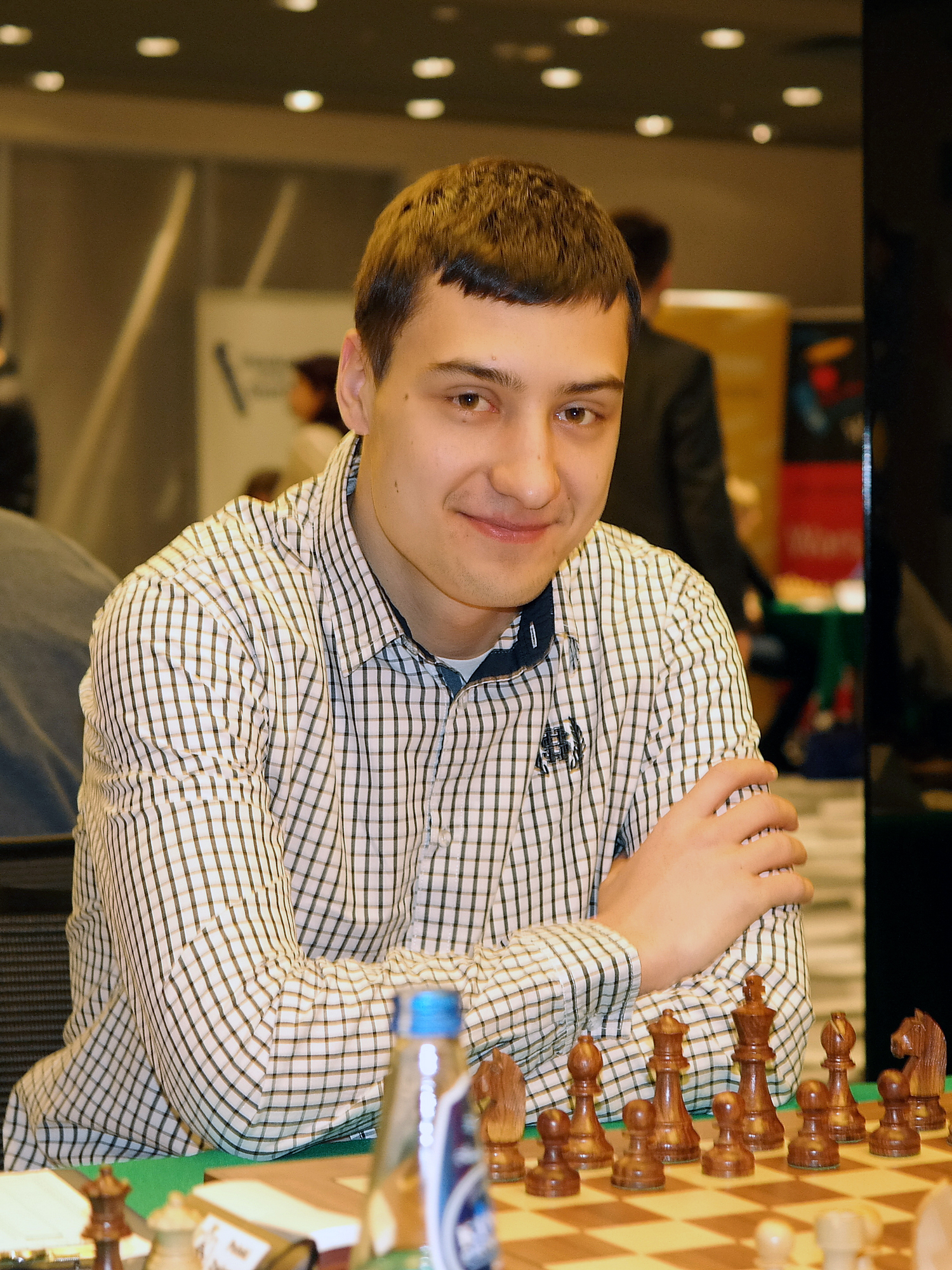
Świerszcz

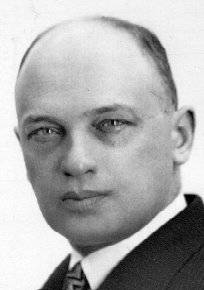
Tartakower

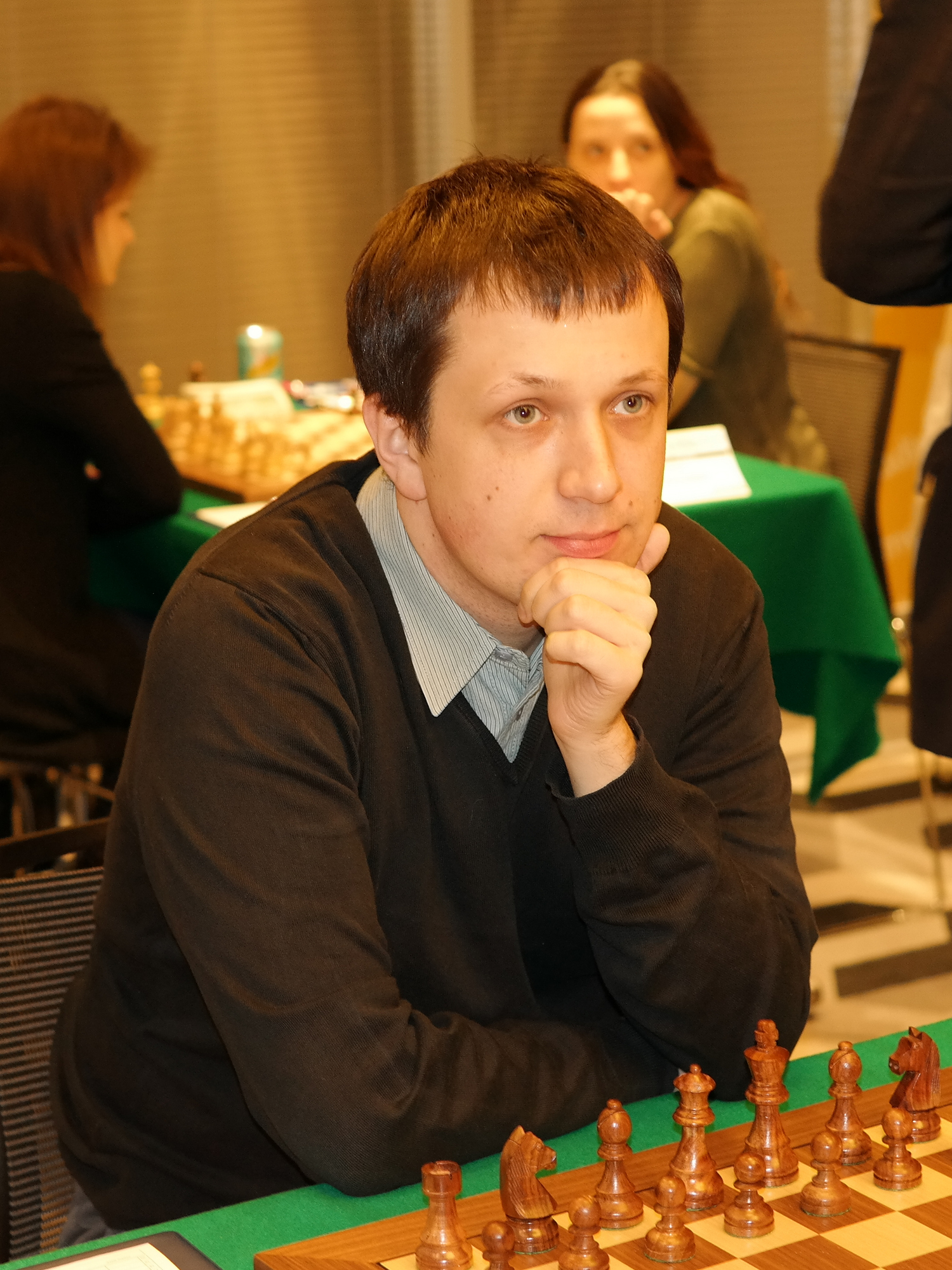
Wojtaszek

== Climbing ==
- Klemens Bachleda, Tatra guide and mountain rescuer
- Kinga Baranowska, mountaineer
- Andrzej Bargiel, ski mountaineer and climber
- Leszek Cichy, high-altitude climber
- Jerzy Kukuczka, high-altitude climber
- Wojciech Kurtyka, high-altitude climber and rock climber
- Aleksandra Mirosław (born 1994), Olympic champion speed climber
- Aleksander Ostrowski, high-altitude climber and extreme skier
- Piotr Pustelnik, high-altitude climber
- Wanda Rutkiewicz, high-altitude climber
- Krzysztof Wielicki, high-altitude climber
- Andrzej Zawada, high-altitude climber
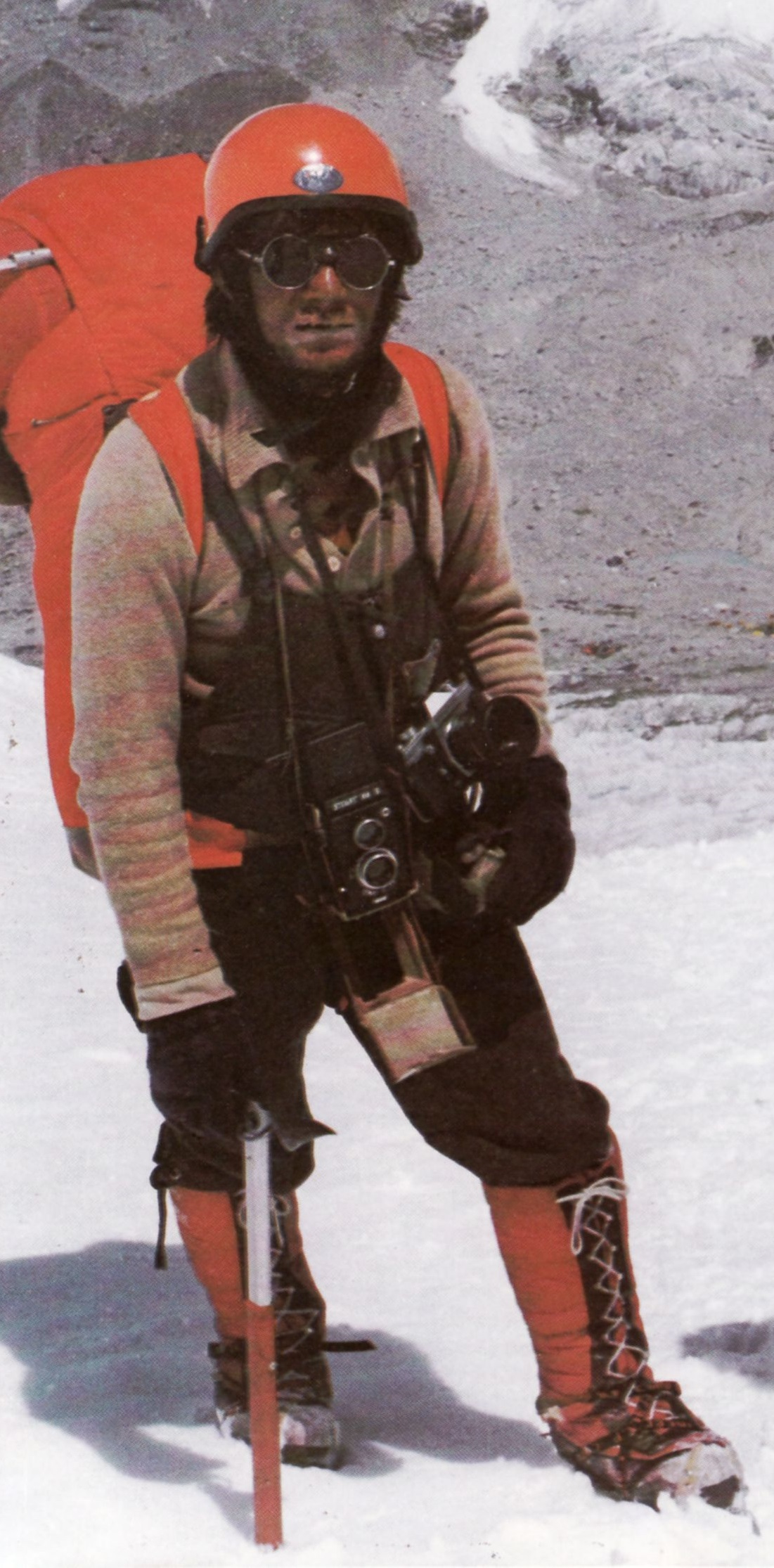
Kukuczka

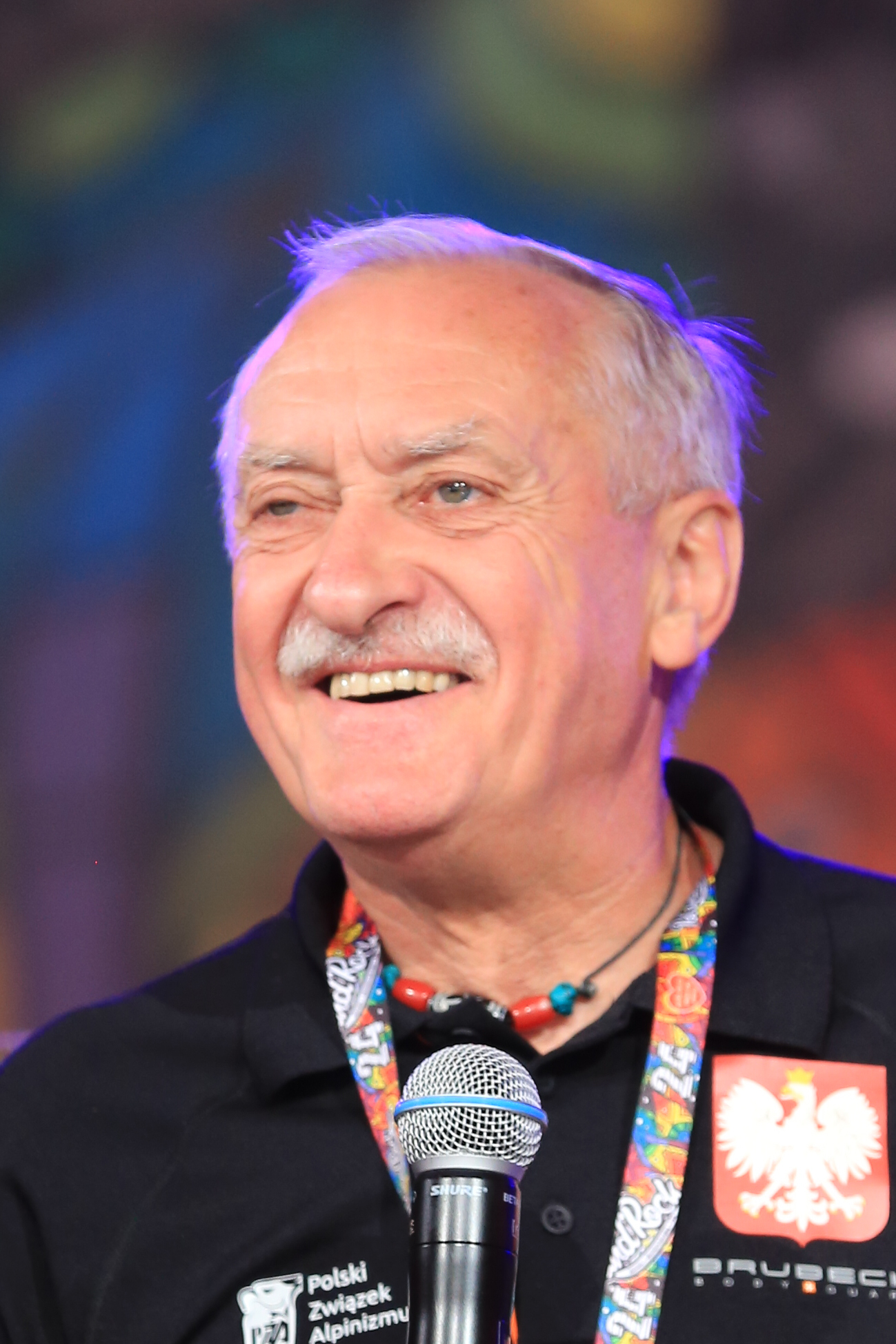
Wielicki

== Cycling ==
- Maciej Bodnar
- Eugenia Bujak
- Zenon Jaskuła
- Justyna Kaczkowska
- Michał Kwiatkowski
- Czesław Lang
- Wacław Latocha
- Rafał Majka
- Przemysław Niemiec
- Katarzyna Niewiadoma
- Mieczysław Nowicki
- Katarzyna Pawłowska
- Daria Pikulik
- Paweł Poljański
- Wojciech Pszczolarski
- Szymon Sajnok
- Sylwester Szmyd
- Stanisław Szozda
- Ryszard Szurkowski, road bicycle racing
- Mateusz Taciak
- Adrian Tekliński
- Piotr Wadecki, road bicycle racing
- Maja Włoszczowska
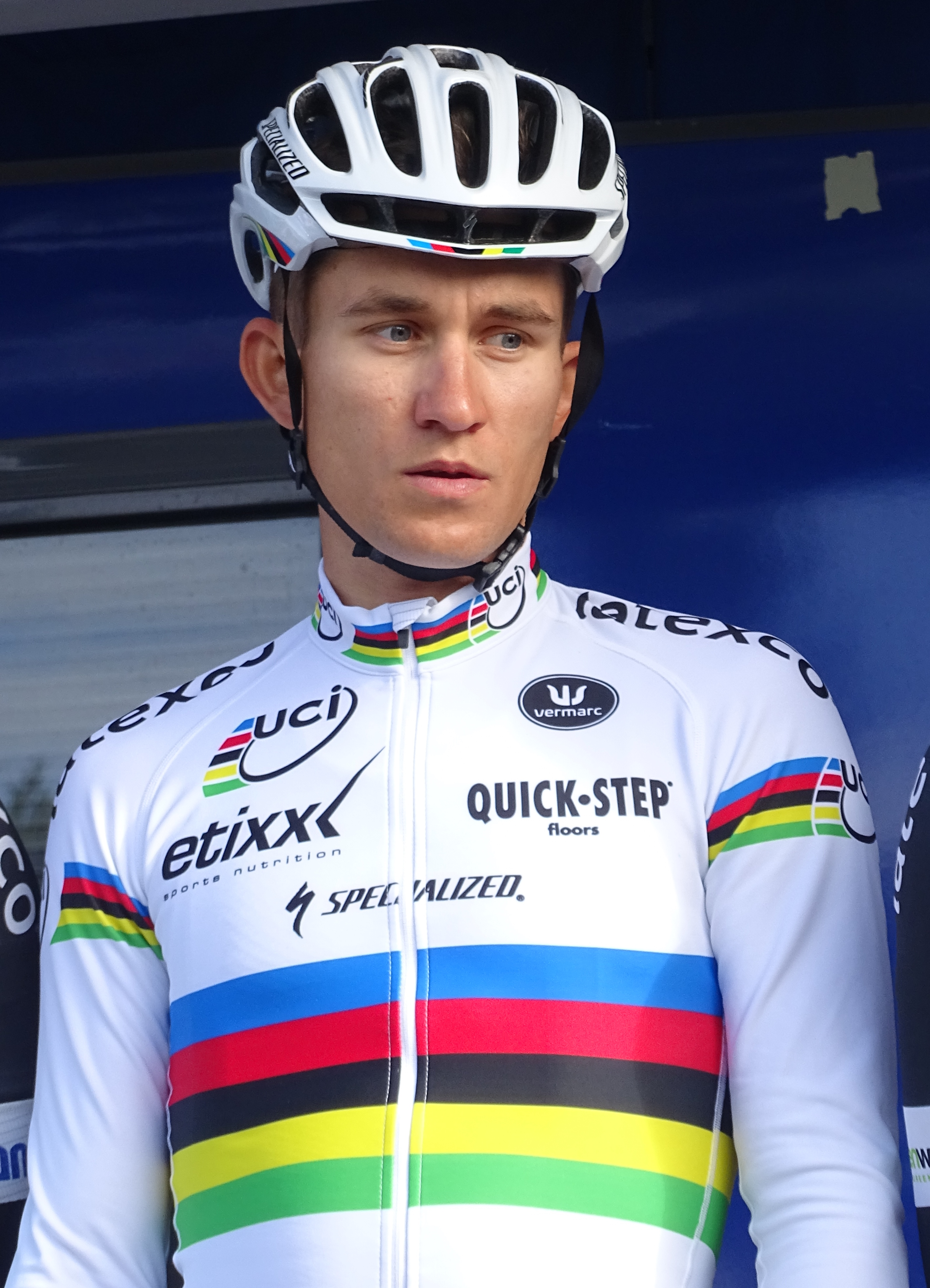
Kwiatkowski

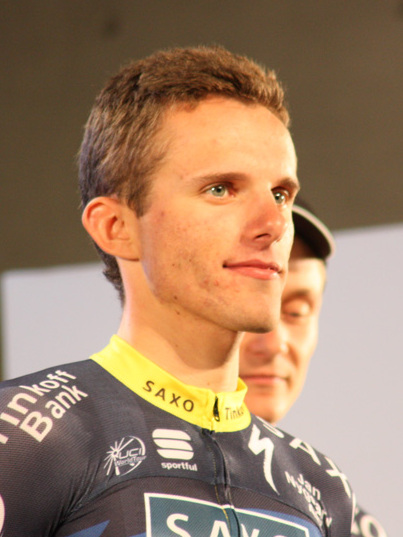
Majka

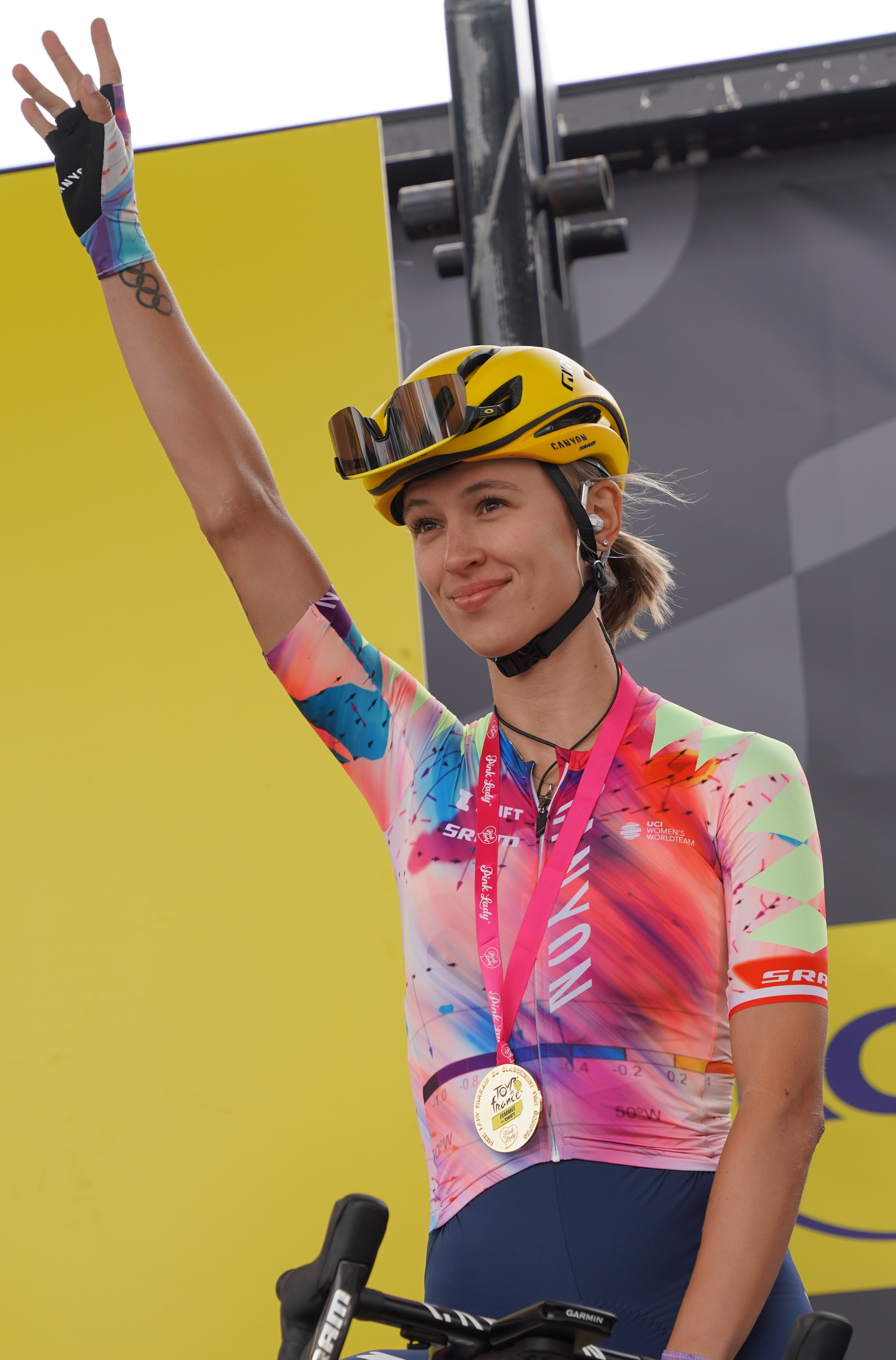
Niewiadoma

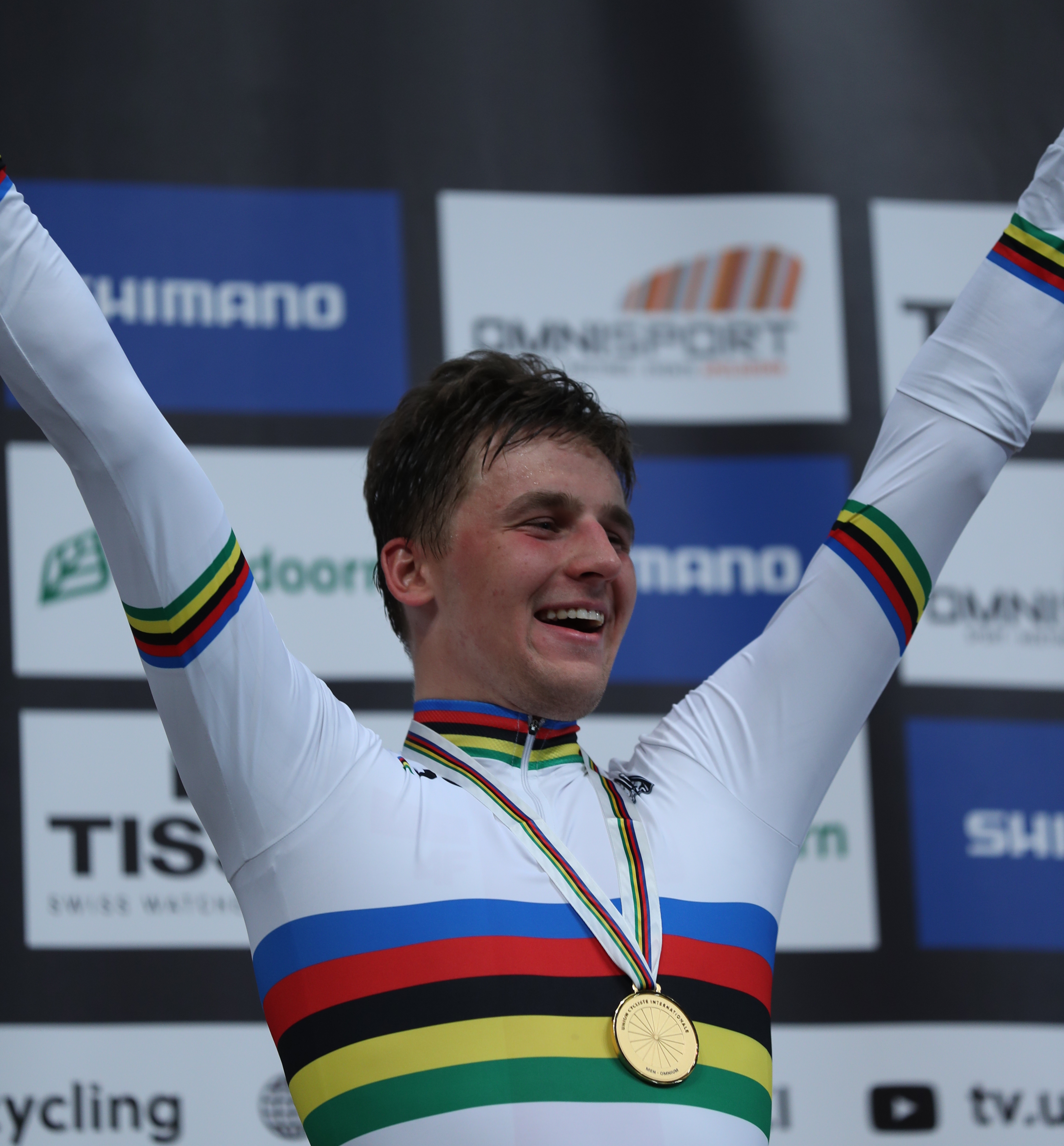
Sajnok

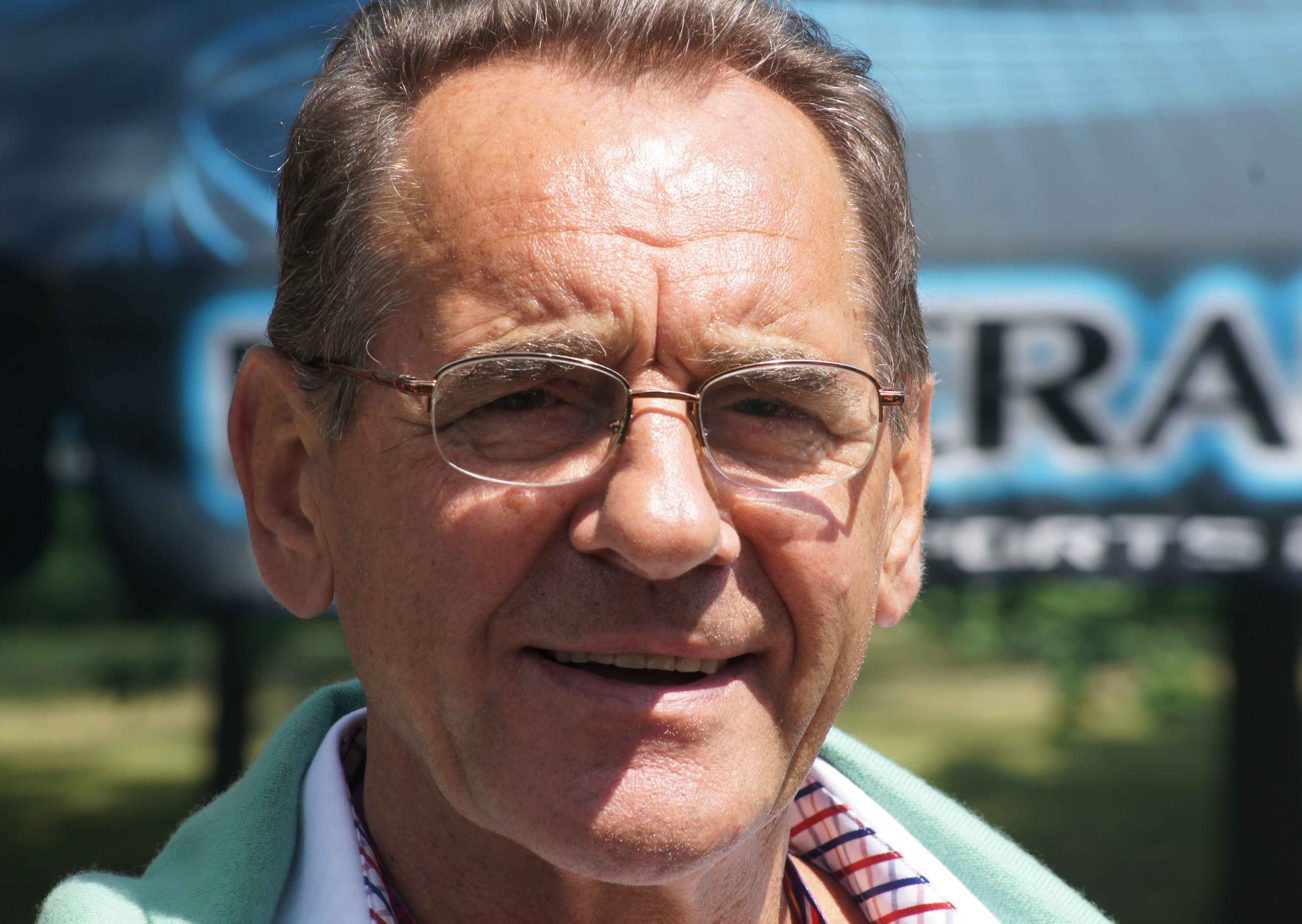
Szurkowski

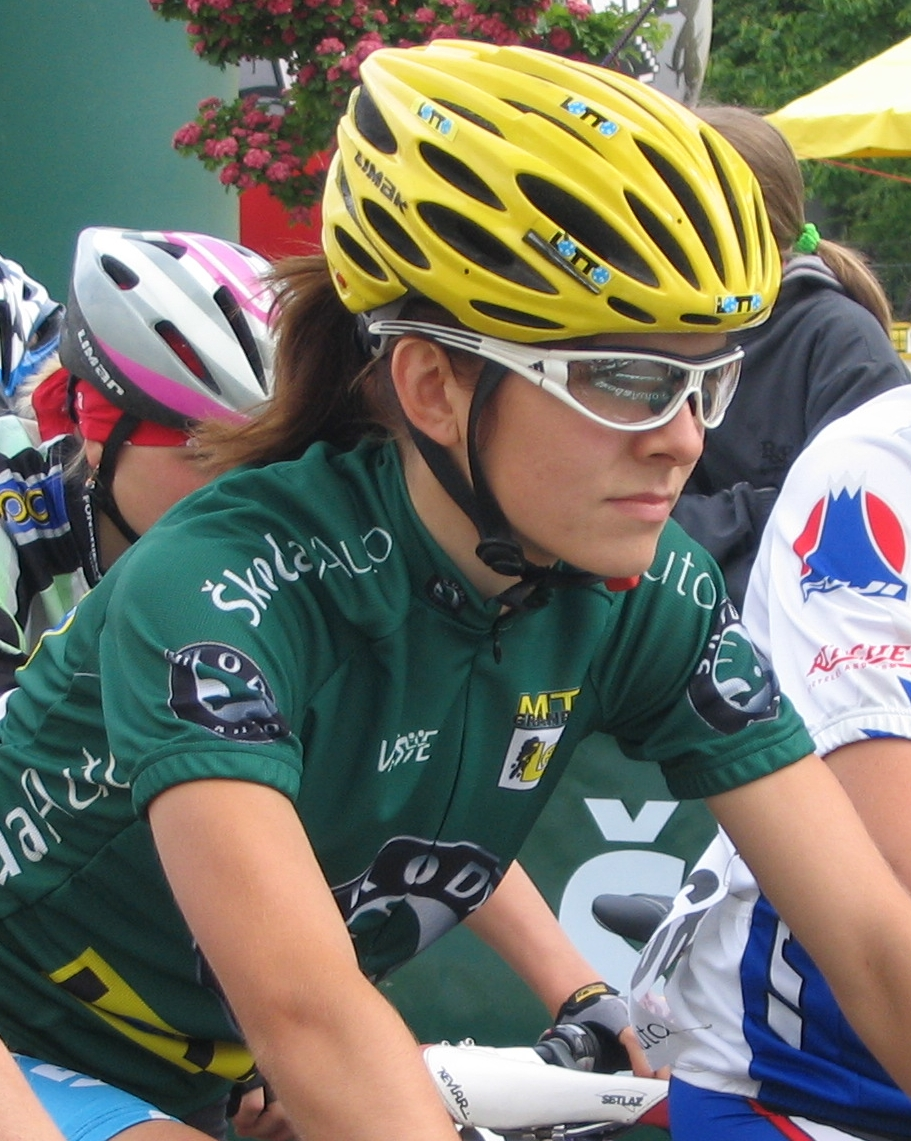
Włoszczowska

== Fencing ==
- Robert Andrzejuk (born 1975), Olympic épée fencer
- Kazimierz Barburski (1942–2016), Olympic épée fencer
- Michał Butkiewicz (born 1942), Olympic épée fencer
- Zbigniew Czajkowski (1921–2019), foil and sabre fencer, and coach
- Egon Franke (1935–2022), Olympic champion foil fencer
- Arkadiusz Godel (born 1952), Olympic champion foil fencer
- Sylwia Gruchała (born 1981), Olympic foil fencer
- Roman Kantor (1912–1943), Olympic épée fencer, murdered in the Majdanek concentration camp
- Renata Knapik-Miazga (born 1988), Olympic épée fencer
- Marcin Koniusz (born 1983), Olympic sabre fencer
- Edward Korfanty (born 1952), Polish-born American fencing master
- Adam Krzesiński (born 1965), Olympic foil fencer
- Ryszard Parulski (1938–2017), Olympic foil fencer
- Jerzy Pawłowski (1932–2005), Olympic champion sabre fencer
- Anna Rybicka (born 1977), Olympic foil fencer
- Ryszard Sobczak (born 1967), Olympic foil fencer
- Aleksandra Socha (born 1982), Olympic sabre fencer
- Rafał Sznajder (1972–2014), Olympic sabre fencer
- Ewa Trzebińska (born 1989), Olympic épée fencer
- Witold Woyda (1939–2008), Olympic champion foil fencer
- Barbara Wysoczańska (born 1949), Olympic foil fencer
- Wojciech Zabłocki (1930–2020), Olympic sabre fencer
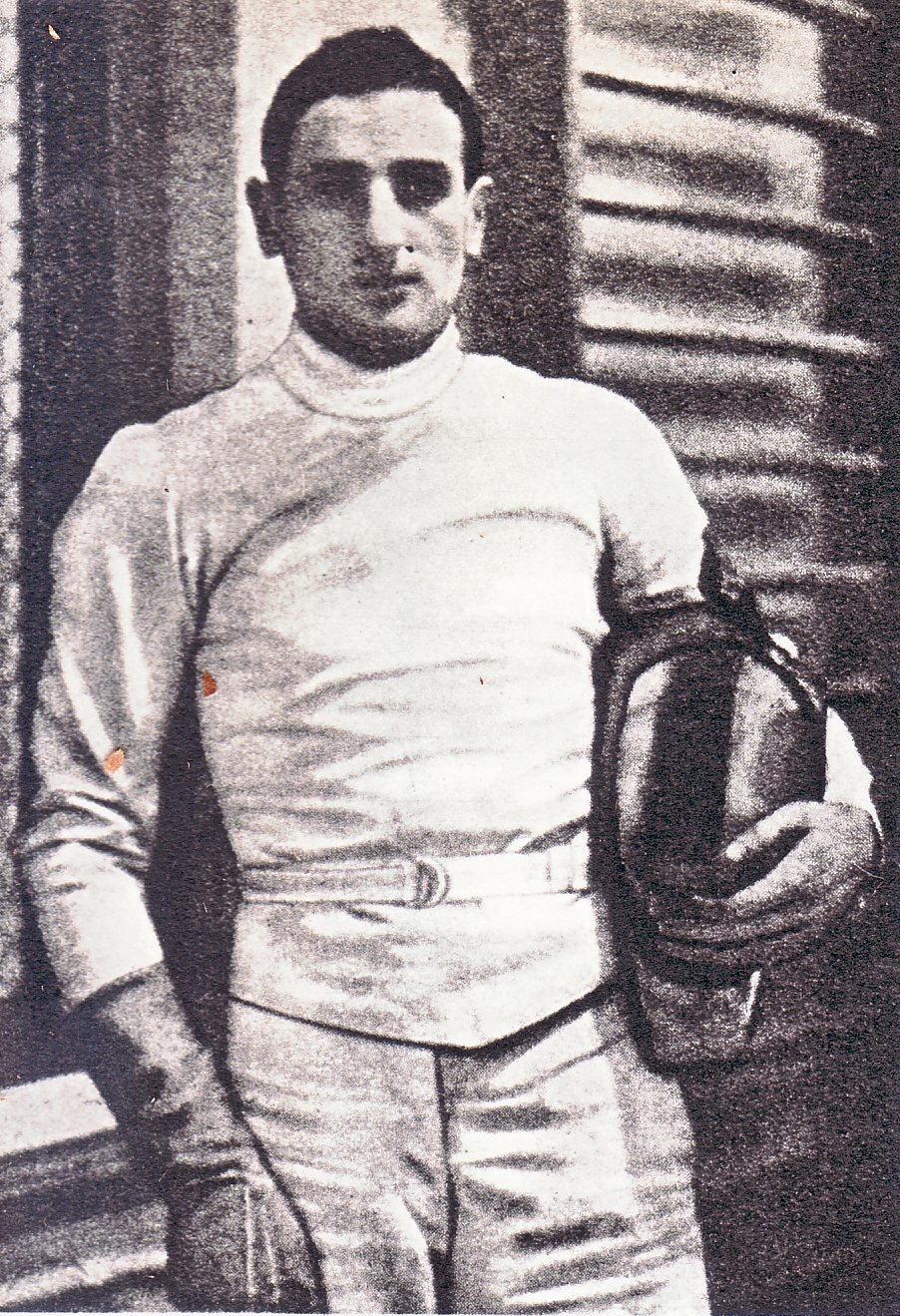
Kantor

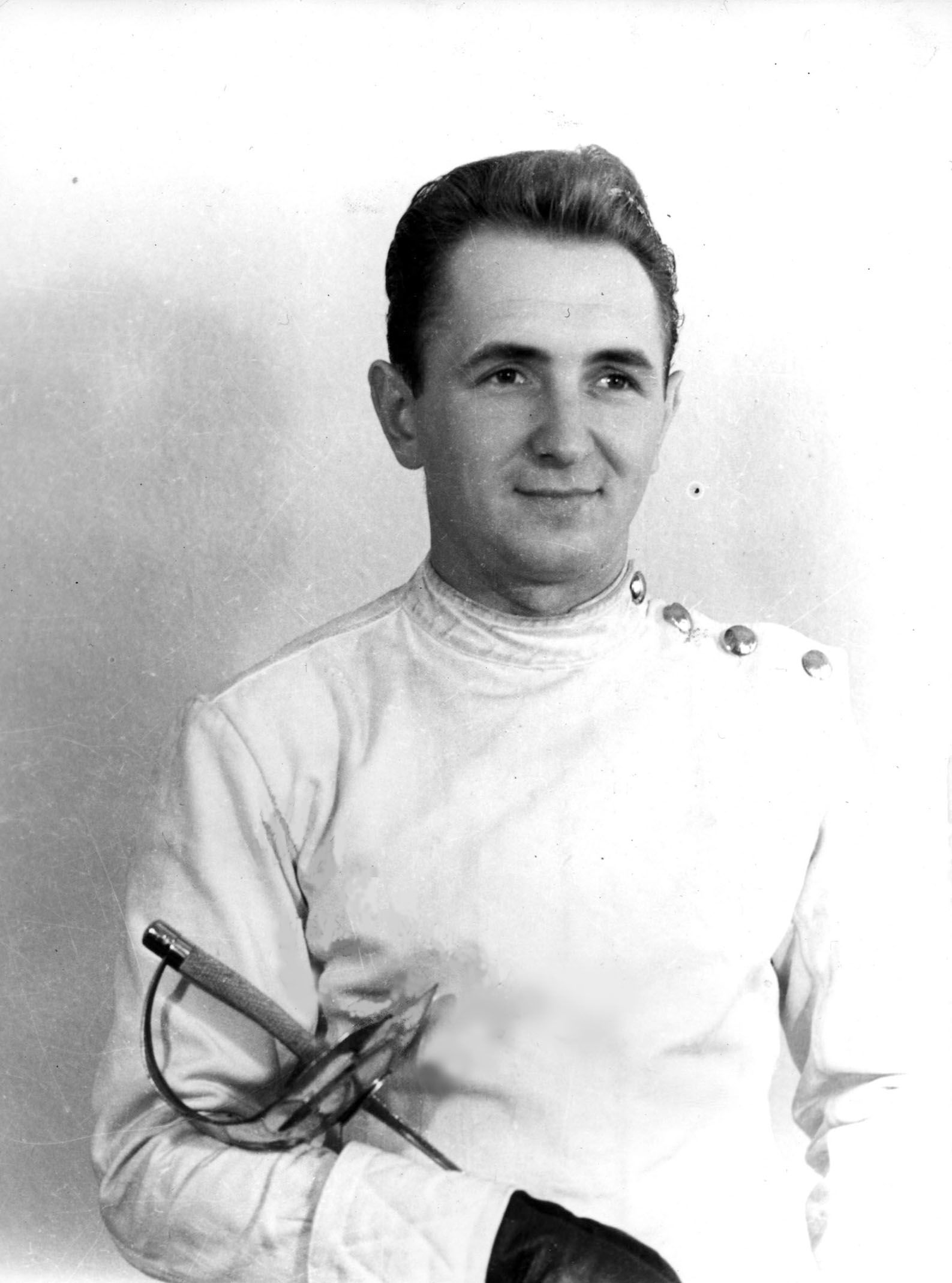
Pawłowski

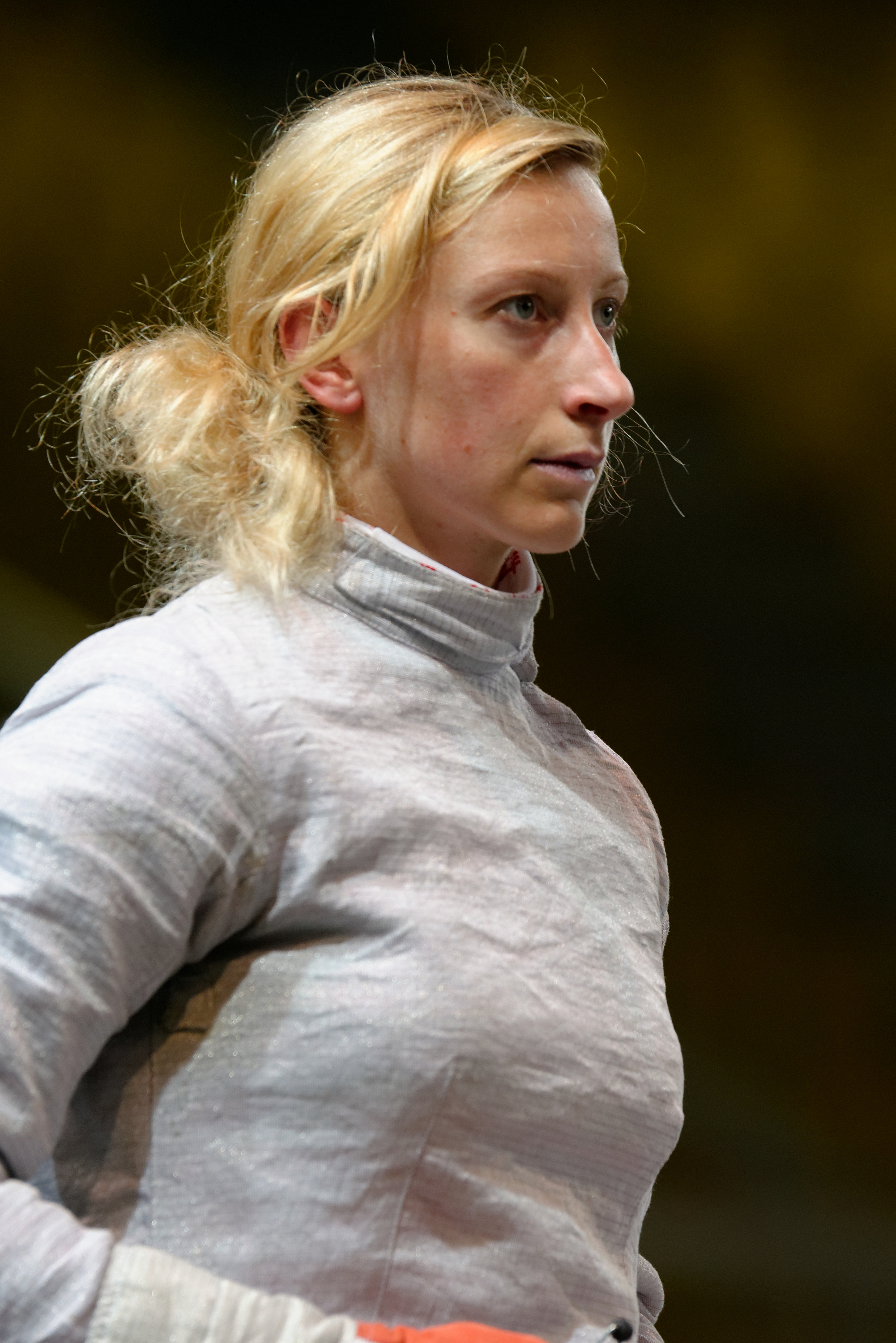
Socha

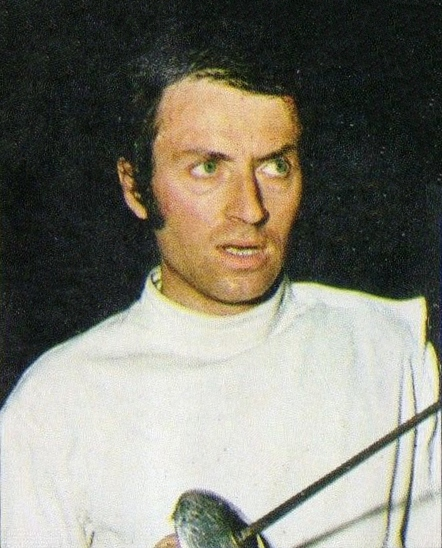
Woyda

== Football ==
- Zygmunt Anczok, defender
- Henryk Apostel, coach
- Jan Banaś, attacker
- Jan Bednarek, defender
- Jakub Błaszczykowski, midfielder
- Zbigniew Boniek, midfielder, head of the Polish Football Association (PZPN)
- Artur Boruc, goalkeeper
- Lucjan Brychczy, midfielder
- Andrzej Buncol, midfielder
- Matty Cash, defender
- Ewald Cebula, defender
- Gerard Cieślik, midfielder
- Lesław Ćmikiewicz, midfielder
- Kazimierz Deyna, midfielder
- Bartłomiej Drągowski, goalkeeper
- Jerzy Dudek, goalkeeper
- Ewald Dytko, midfielder
- Łukasz Fabiański, goalkeeper
- Robert Gadocha, attacker
- Ludwik Gintel, defender/forward
- Jacek Gmoch, coach
- Jerzy Gorgoń, defender
- Kazimierz Górski, coach
- Kamil Grabara, goalkeeper
- Ya'akov Grundman (Jakub Grundman' 1939–2004), midfielder and manager
- Paweł Janas, defender, coach
- Ireneusz Jeleń, attacker
- Erich Juskowiak, defender
- Józef Kałuża, attacker, coach
- Henryk Kasperczak, midfielder, coach
- Jakub Kiwior, defender
- Miroslav Klose, attacker
- Józef Klotz, defender; murdered by the Nazis
- Raymond Kopa, attacker
- Hubert Kostka, goalkeeper
- Tadeusz Kuchar, midfielder, coach
- Tomasz Kuszczak, goalkeeper
- Grzegorz Lato, attacker
- Robert Lewandowski, attacker
- Jan Liberda, attacker
- Włodzimierz Lubański, attacker
- Józef Lustgarten, midfielder, manager
- Stefan Majewski, defender, coach
- Szymon Marciniak, football referee
- Ladislao Mazurkiewicz, goalkeeper
- Arkadiusz Milik, attacker
- Józef Młynarczyk, goalkeeper
- Piotr Nowak, midfielder
- Erwin Nyc, midfielder
- Teodor Peterek, attacker
- Krzysztof Piątek, attacker
- Ryszard Piec, midfielder
- Wilhelm Piec, midfielder
- Antoni Piechniczek, defender, coach
- Leonard Piontek, midfielder
- Lukas Podolski, attacker
- Łukasz Piszczek, defender
- Ernest Pohl, attacker
- Fryderyk Scherfke, midfielder
- Itzhak Schneor, defender
- Yisha'ayahu Schwager (Jeszaja Szwagier), Olympic defender
- Ebi Smolarek, attacker
- Włodzimierz Smolarek, midfielder
- Leon Sperling, forward (left wing)
- Zygmunt Steuermann, forward
- Karol Swiderski, forward
- Piotr Świerczewski, midfielder
- Grzegorz Szamotulski, goalkeeper
- Andrzej Szarmach, attacker
- Władysław Szczepaniak, defender
- Wojciech Szczęsny, goalkeeper
- Edward Szymkowiak, goalkeeper
- Andrzej Szczypkowski (born 1971), midfielder
- Łukasz Teodorczyk, attacker
- Jan Tomaszewski, goalkeeper
- Piotr Trochowski, midfielder
- Krzysztof Warzycha, attacker
- Ernest Wilimowski, attacker
- Walter Winkler, defender
- Maryan Wisnieski, attacker
- Gerard Wodarz, attacker
- Łukasz Załuska, goalkeeper
- Piotr Zieliński, midfielder
- Władysław Żmuda, defender
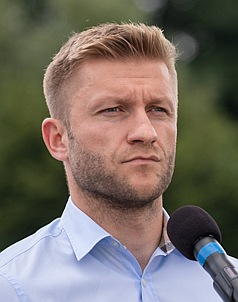
Błaszczykowski

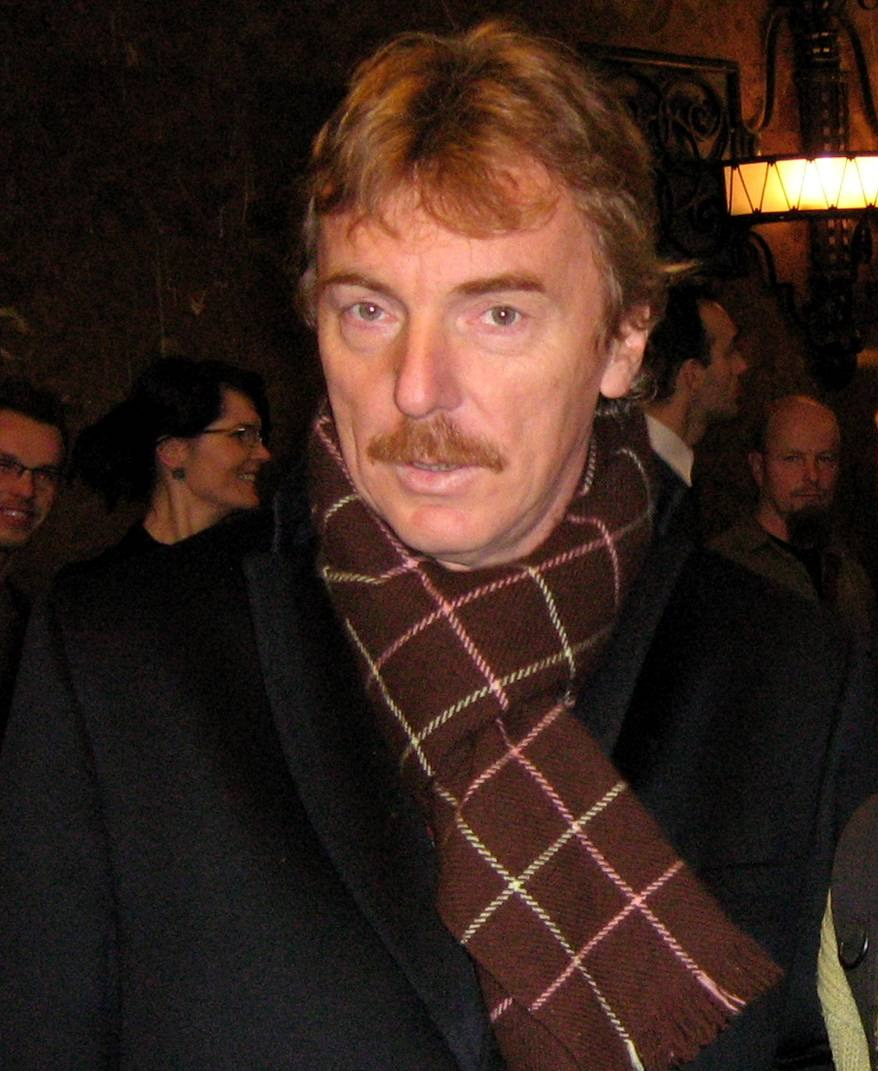
Boniek

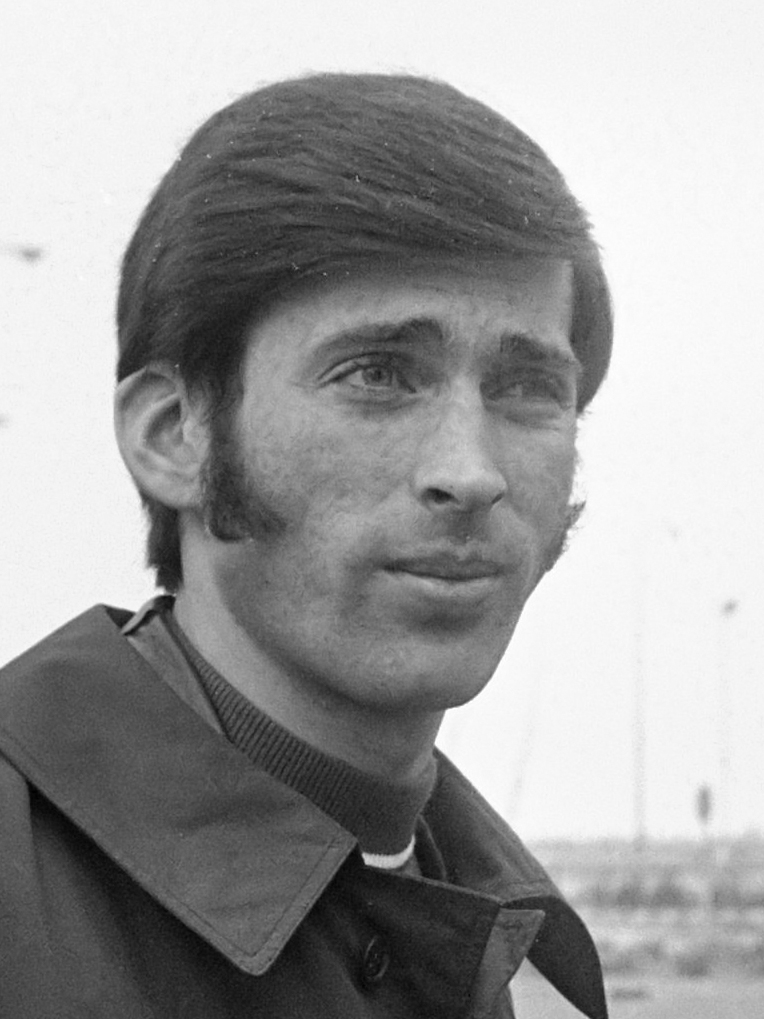
Deyna

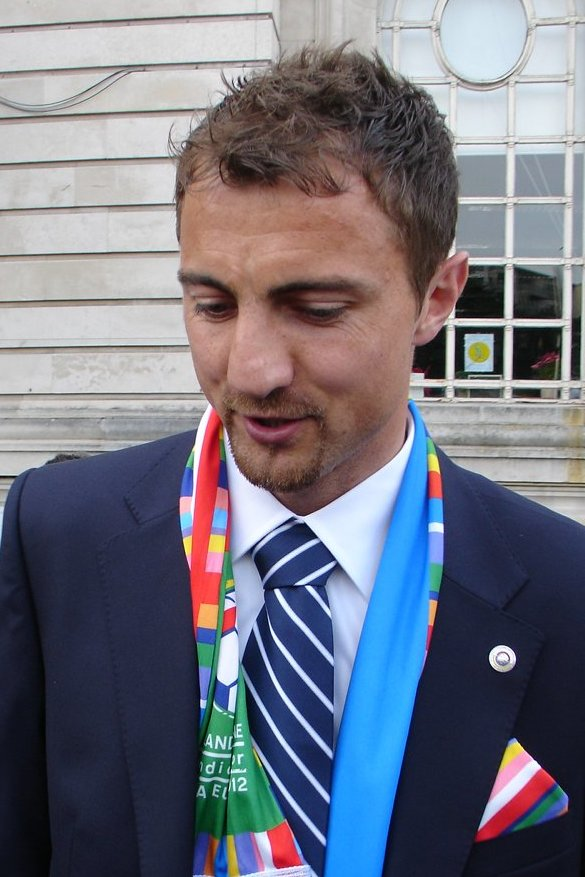
Dudek

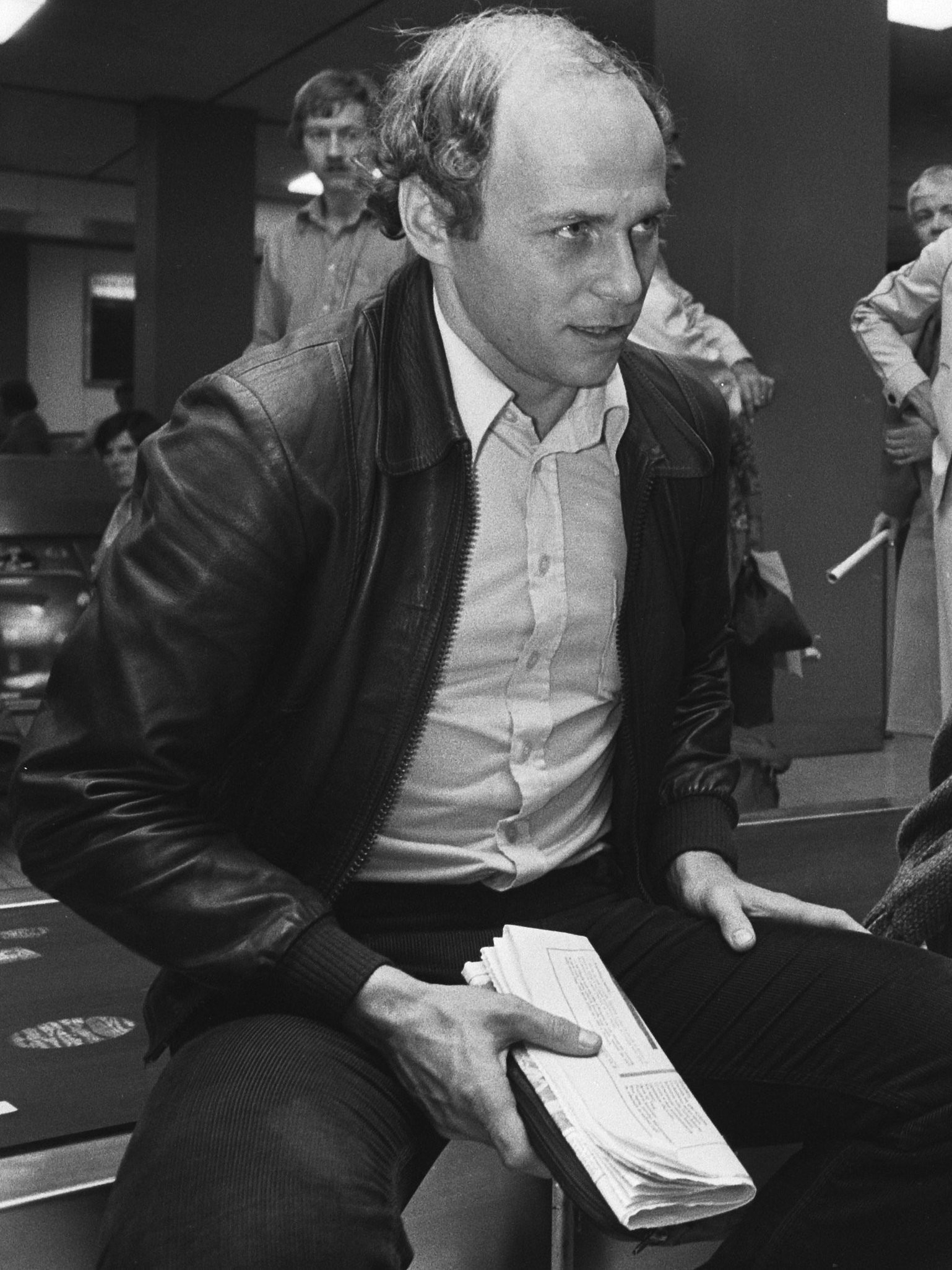
Lato

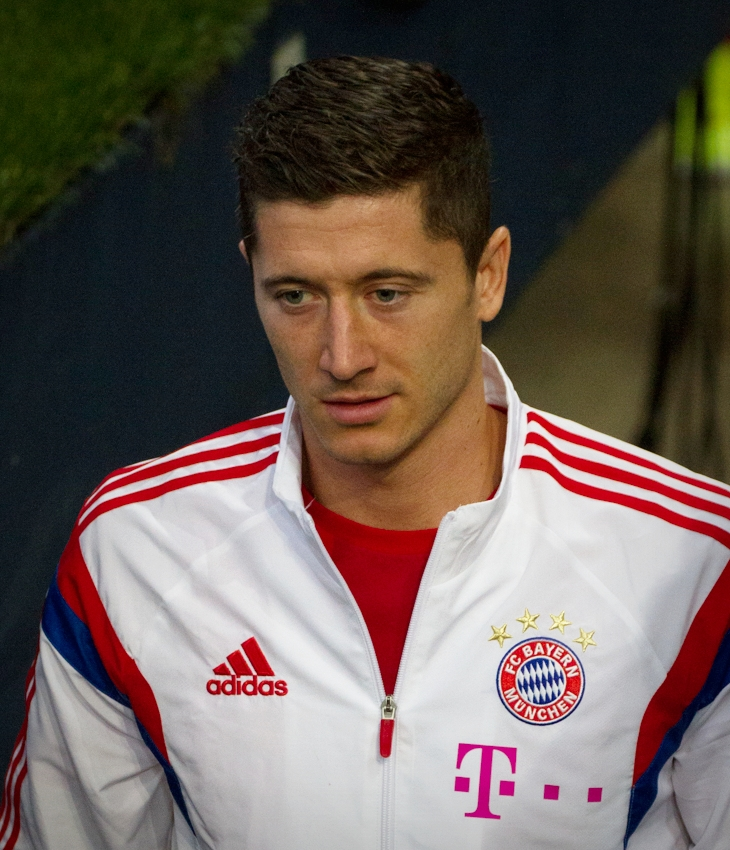
R. Lewandowski

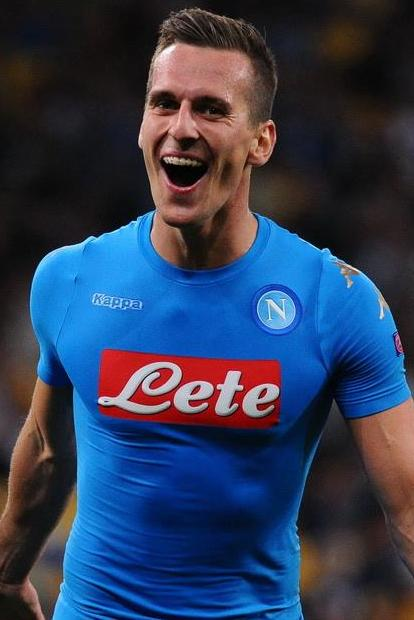
Milik

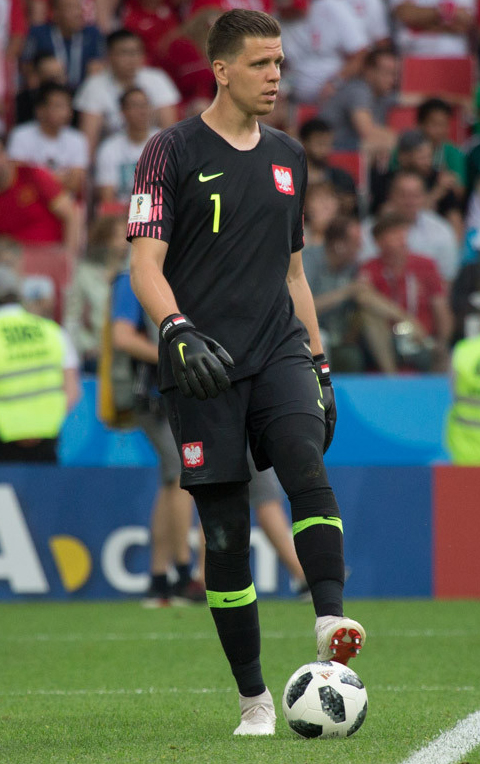
Szczęsny

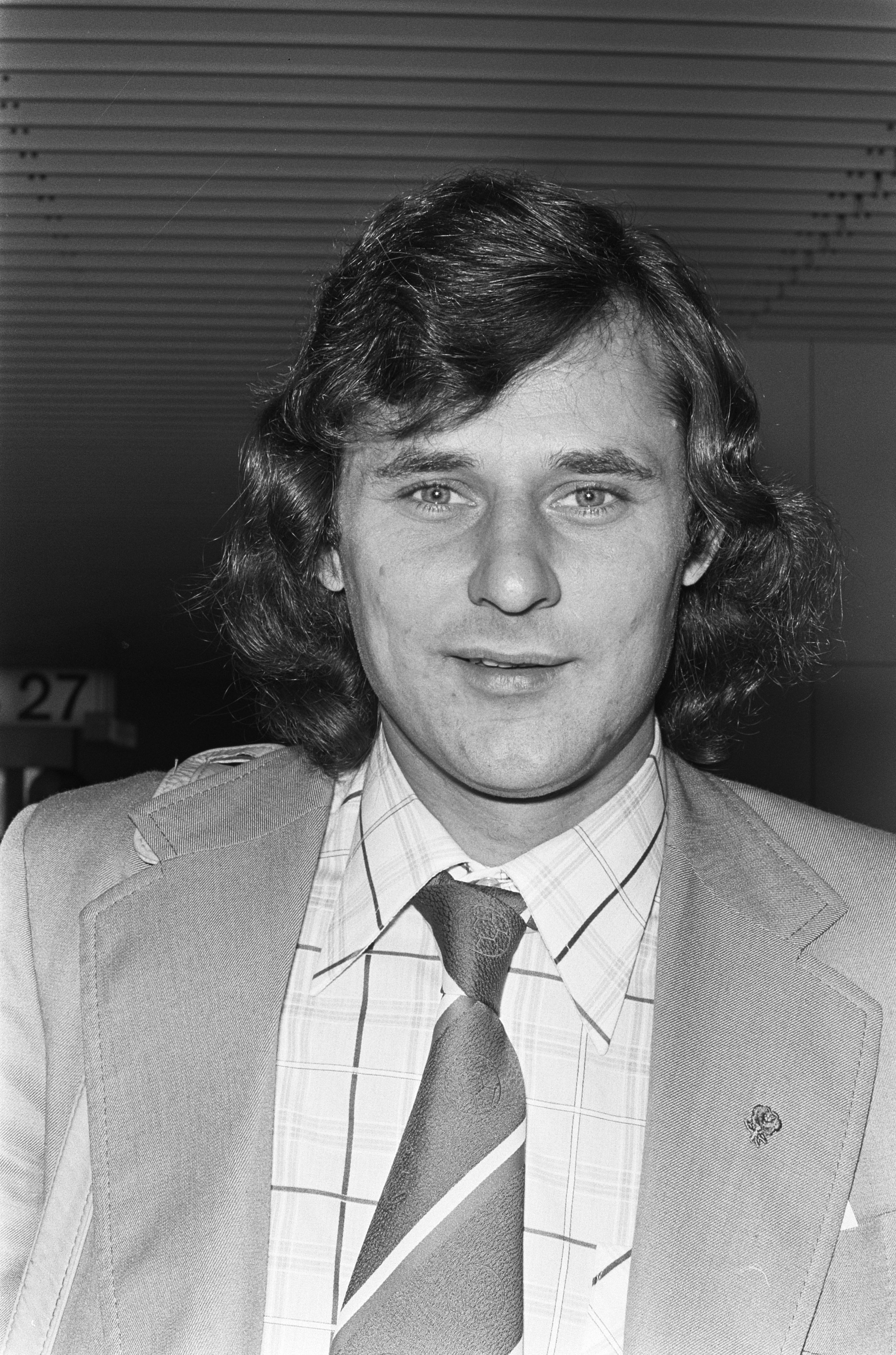
Tomaszewski

== Ice hockey ==
- Mariusz Czerkawski
- Wayne Gretzky, mixed Polish descent
- Gordie Howe, mixed Polish descent
- Mike Komisarek
- Ed Olczyk
- Krzysztof Oliwa
- Brian Rafalski
- Peter Sidorkiewicz, Polish-Canadian
- Bryan Smolinski
- Pete Stemkowski
- Lee Stempniak
- Daniel Tkaczuk
- James Wisniewski
- Wojtek Wolski, Polish-Canadian
- Travis Zajac
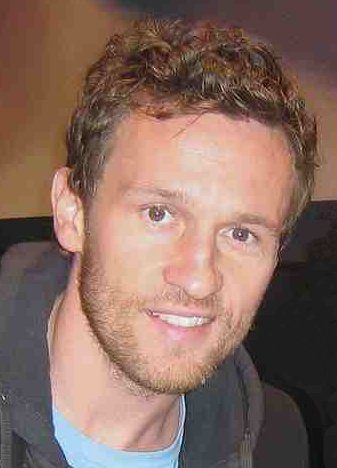
Czerkawski

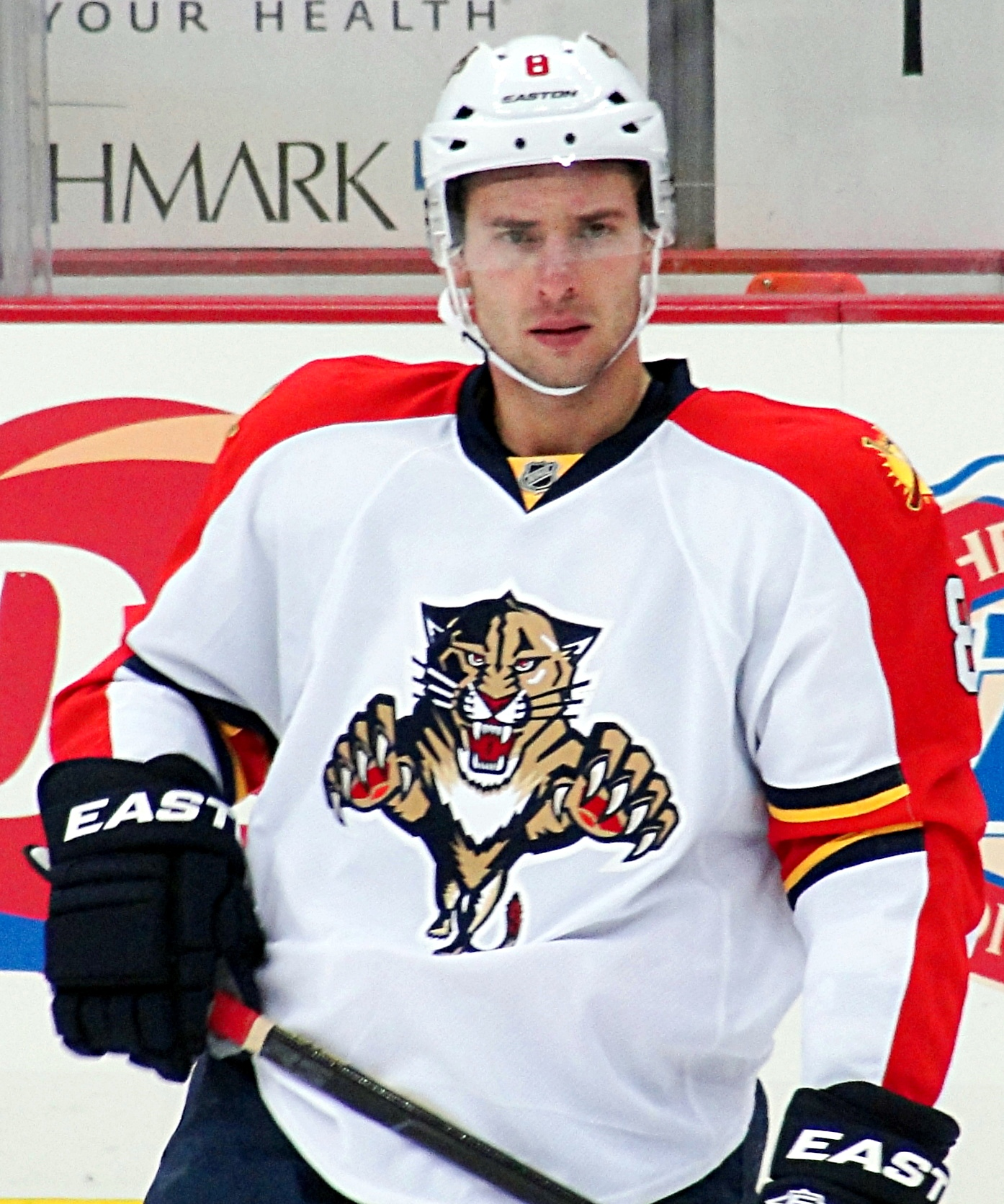
Wolski

== Judo ==
- Rafał Kubacki (born 1967), Olympic judoka
- Waldemar Legień (born 1963), Olympic champion judoka
- Paweł Nastula (born 1970), Olympic champion judoka

== Skating ==
- Karolina Bosiek, speed skater
- Zbigniew Bródka, speed skater
- Patrycja Maliszewska, short track speed skater
- Elwira Seroczyńska, speed skater
- Jan Szymański, speed skater

== Skiing ==
- Konrad Bartelski, Alpine ski racer
- Bronisław Czech, Alpine ski racer
- Piotr Fijas, ski jumper
- Wojciech Fortuna, ski jumper
- Krystyna Guzik, biathlete
- Monika Hojnisz, biathlete
- Stefan Hula, Sr., Nordic combined skier
- Stefan Hula, Jr., ski jumper
- Justyna Kowalczyk, cross-country skier
- Maciej Kot, ski jumper
- Dawid Kubacki, ski jumper
- Józef Łuszczek, cross-country skier
- Adam Małysz, ski jumper
- Jan Marusarz, World War II Carpathian Mountains escort of intelligence agent Krystyna Skarbek
- Stanisław Marusarz, ski jumper
- Weronika Nowakowska, biathlete
- Tomasz Sikora, biathlete
- Monika Skinder, cross-country skiing
- Kamil Stoch, ski jumper
- Jan Ziobro, ski jumper
- Piotr Żyła, ski jumper
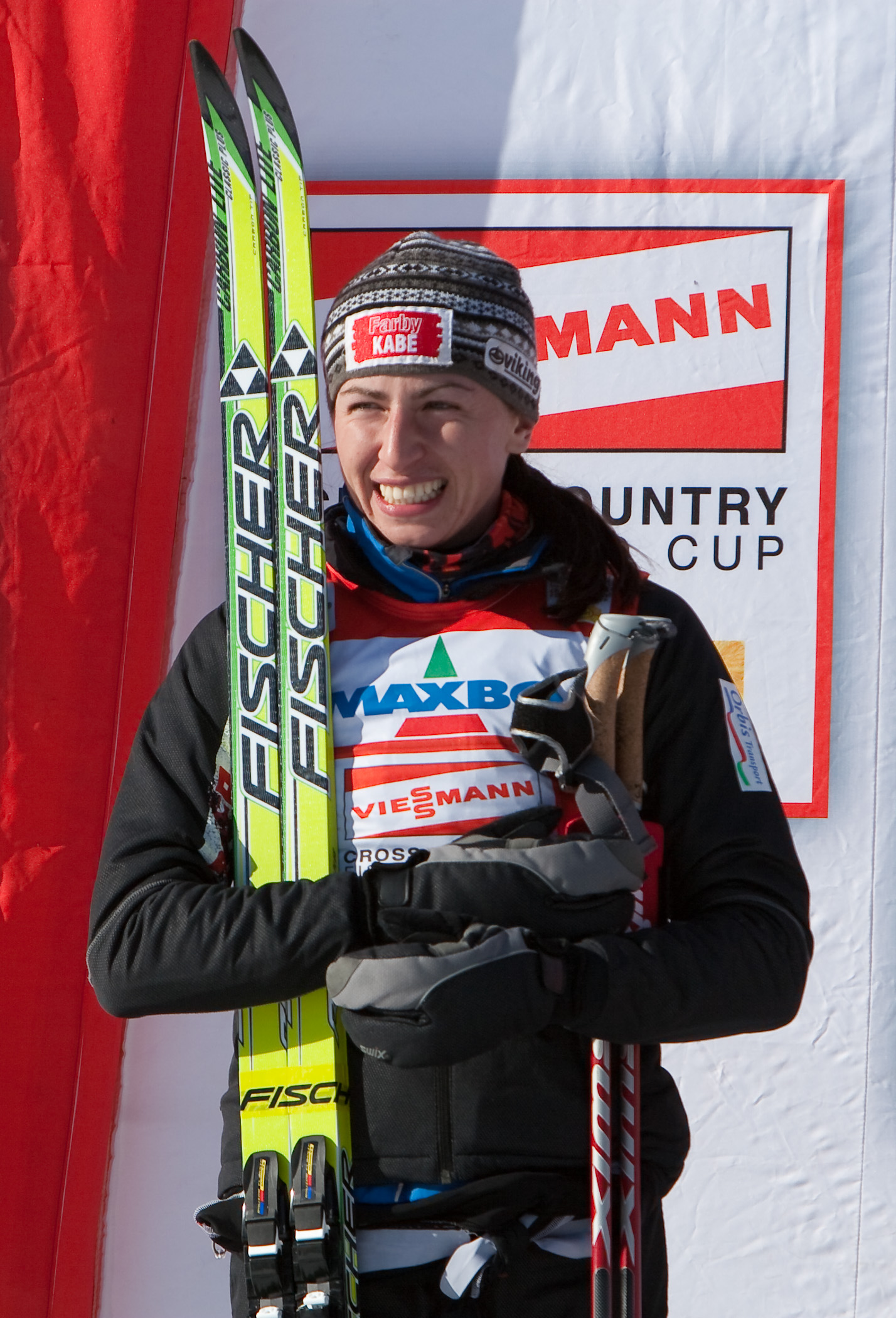
Kowalczyk

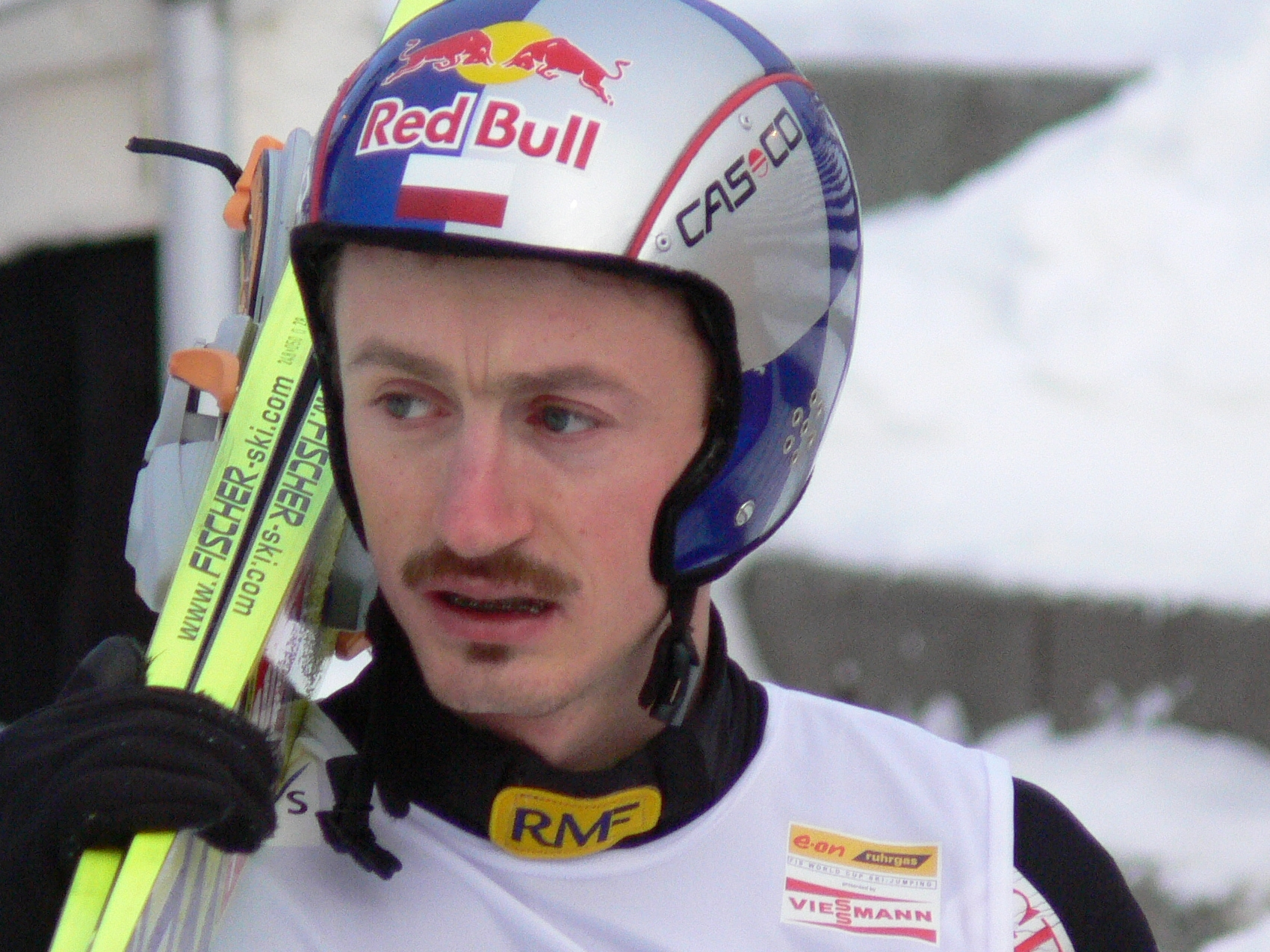
Małysz

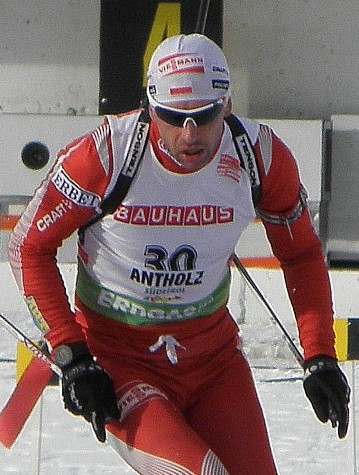
Sikora

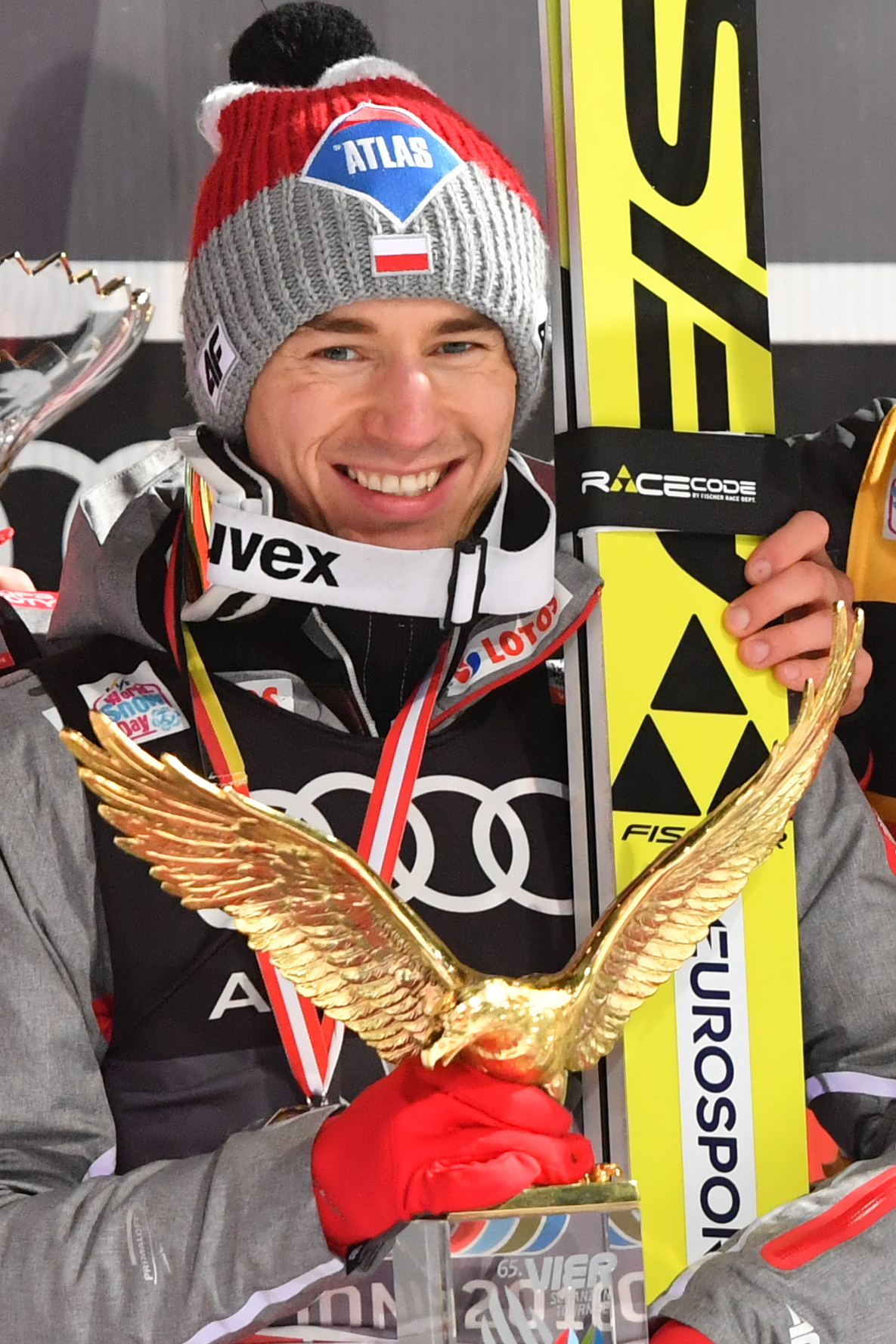
Stoch

== Swimming ==
- Katarzyna Baranowska
- Konrad Czerniak
- Agnieszka Czopek
- Otylia Jędrzejczak
- Radosław Kawęcki
- Bartosz Kizierowski
- Michael Klim, Australian
- Agata Korc
- Paweł Korzeniowski
- Daniel Kowalski, Australian
- Sławomir Kuczko
- Ksawery Masiuk
- Mariusz Podkościelny
- Mateusz Sawrymowicz
- Lejzor Ilja Szrajbman; murdered by the Nazis in Majdanek concentration camp
- Rafał Szukała
- Katarzyna Wasick
- Wojciech Wojdak
- Artur Wojdat
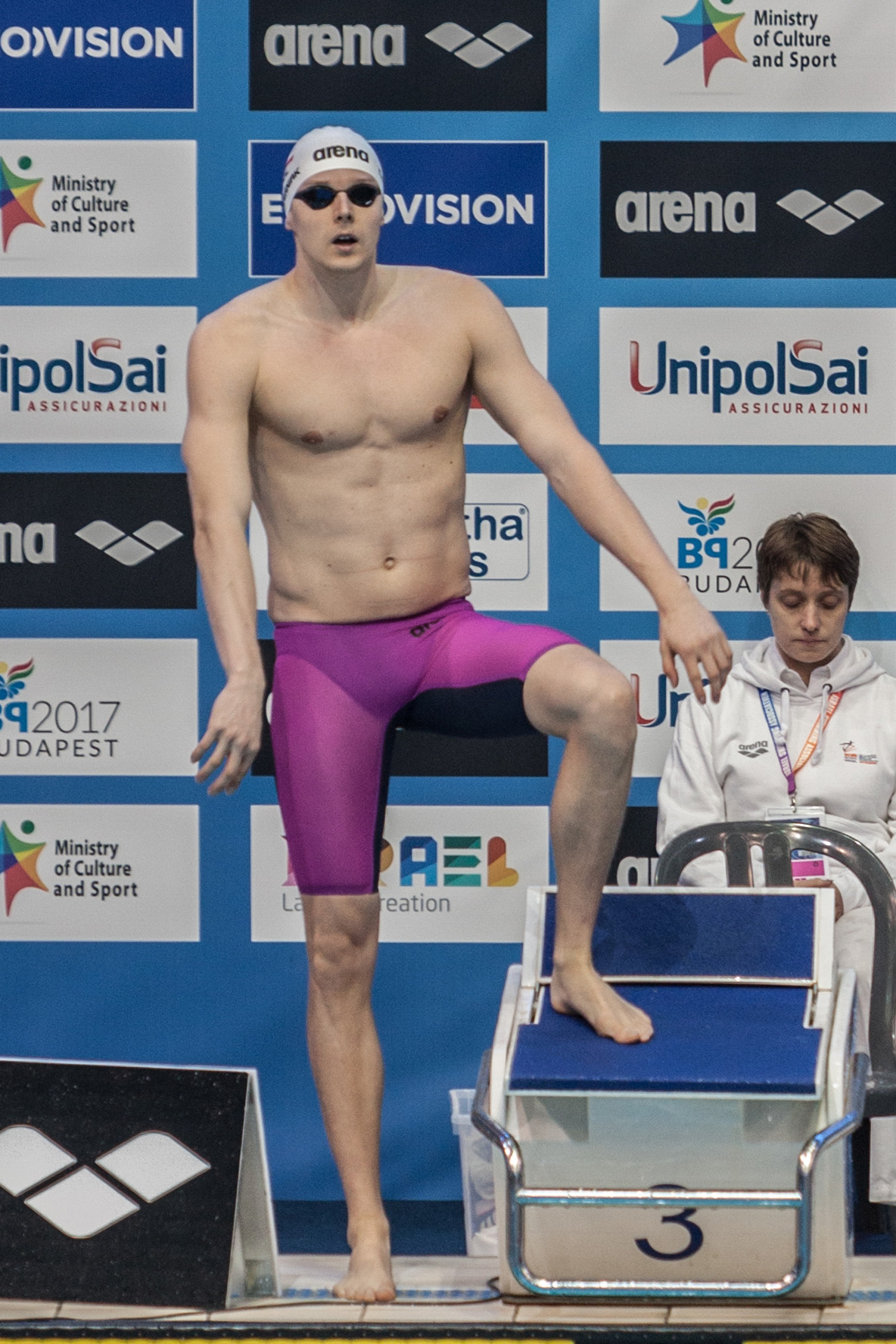
Czerniak

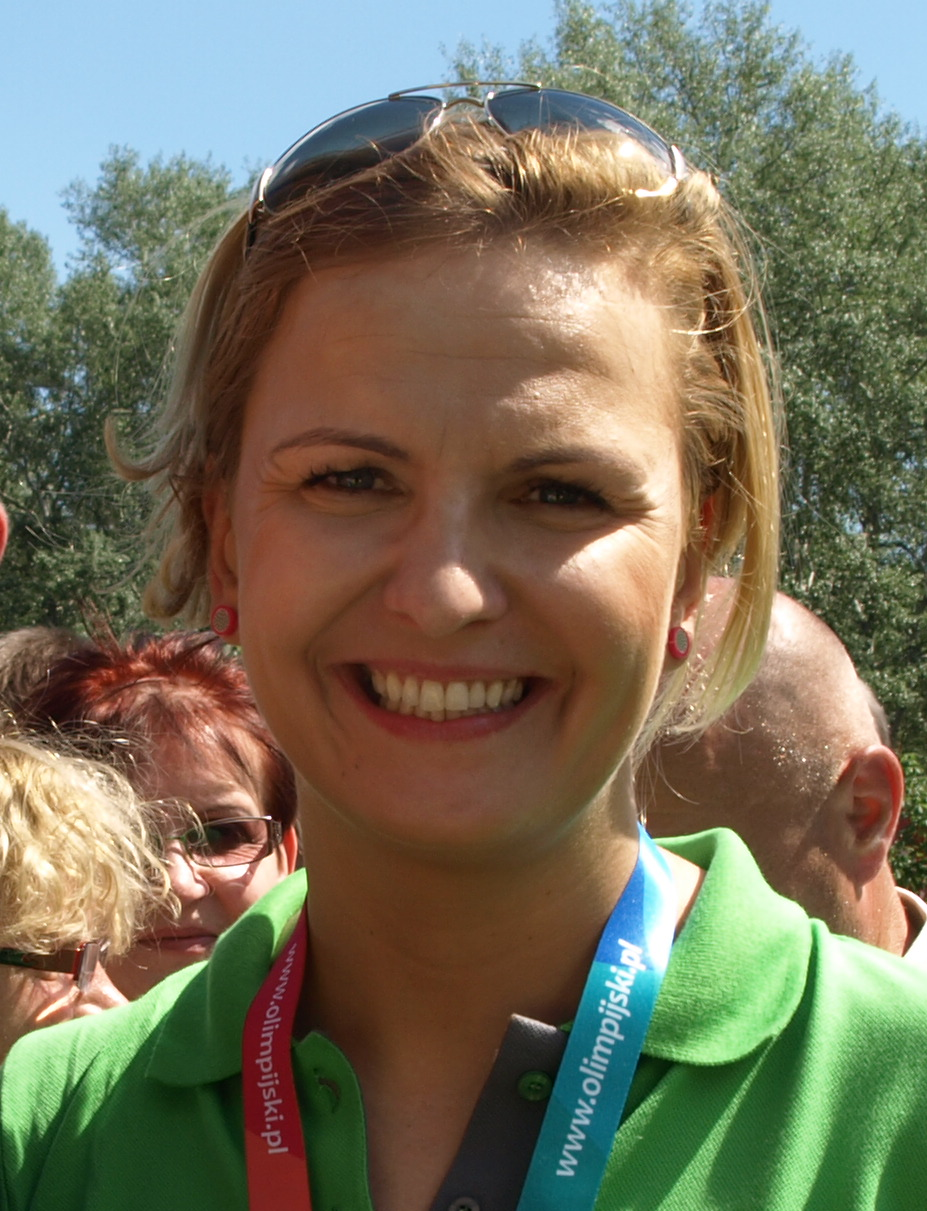
Jędrzejczak

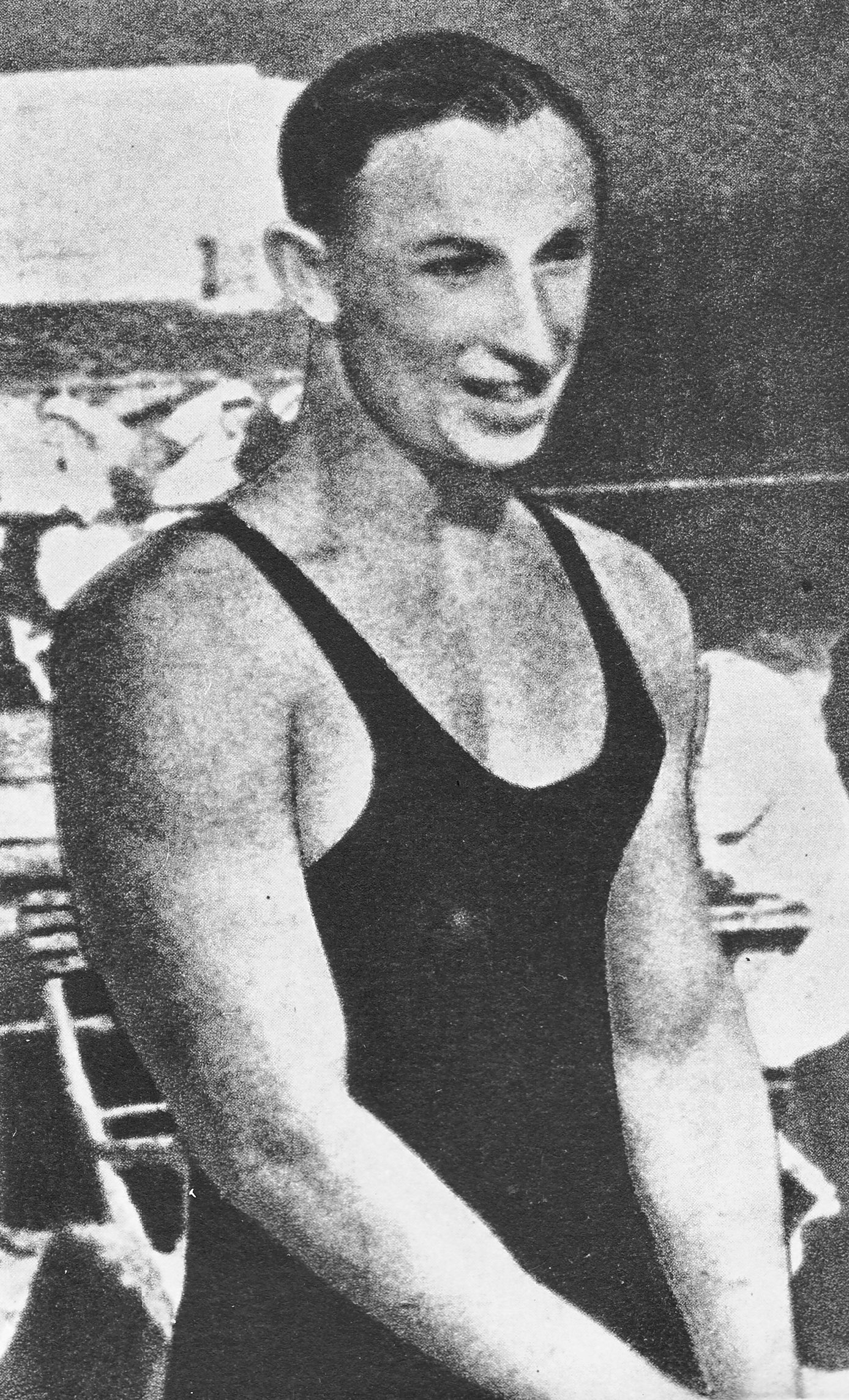
Szrajbman

== Tennis ==
- Wojciech Fibak
- Magdalena Fręch
- Mariusz Fyrstenberg
- Hubert Hurkacz
- Jerzy Janowicz
- Klaudia Jans-Ignacik
- Jadwiga Jędrzejowska
- Angelique Kerber, German
- Łukasz Kubot
- Magda Linette
- Sabine Lisicki, German
- Kamil Majchrzak
- Marcin Matkowski
- Daniel Prenn (1904–1991), Russian-born German, Polish, and British world-top-ten tennis player
- Michał Przysiężny
- Agnieszka Radwańska
- Urszula Radwańska
- Władysław Skonecki
- Iga Świątek
- Caroline Wozniacki, Danish
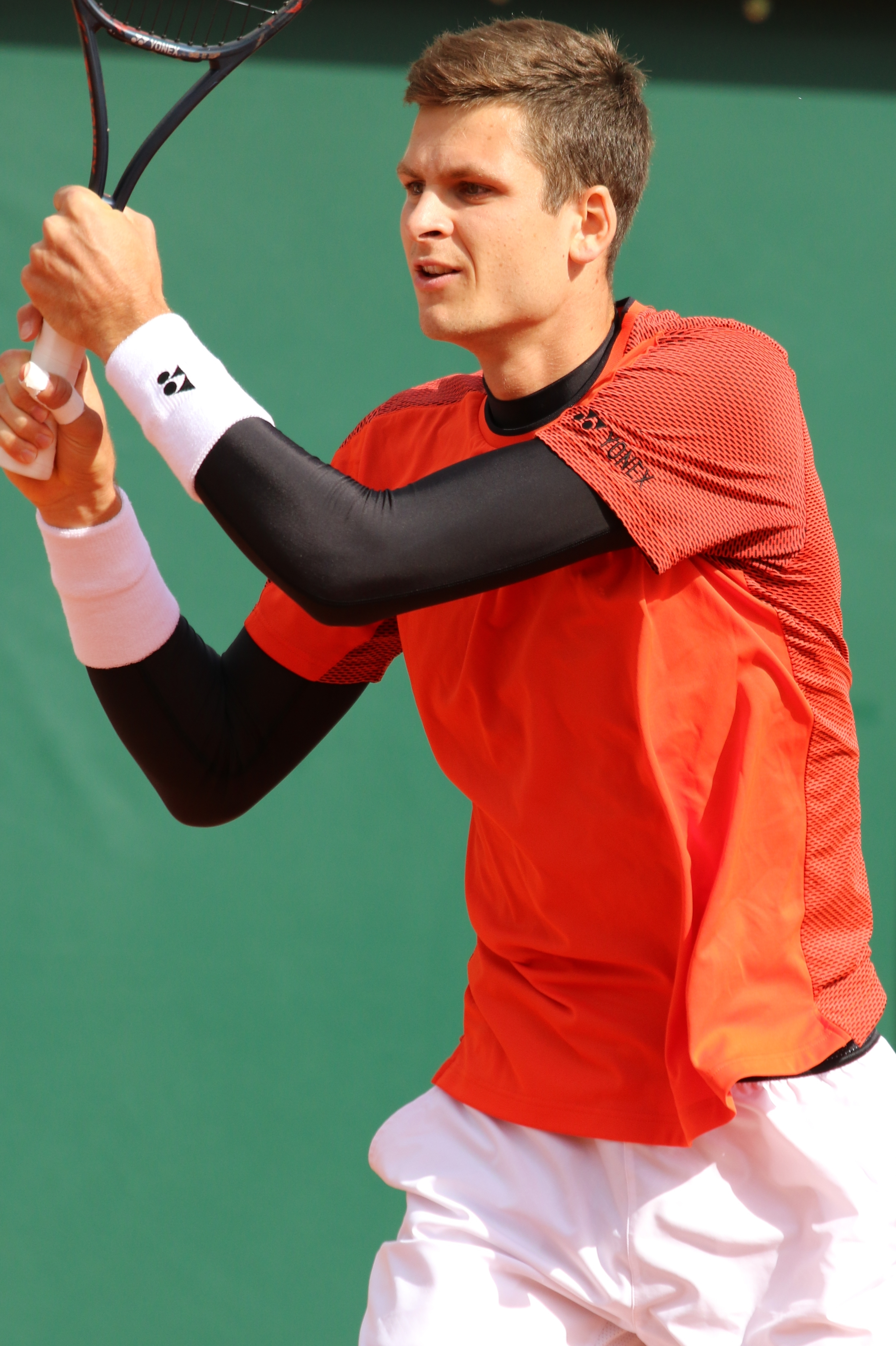
Hurkacz

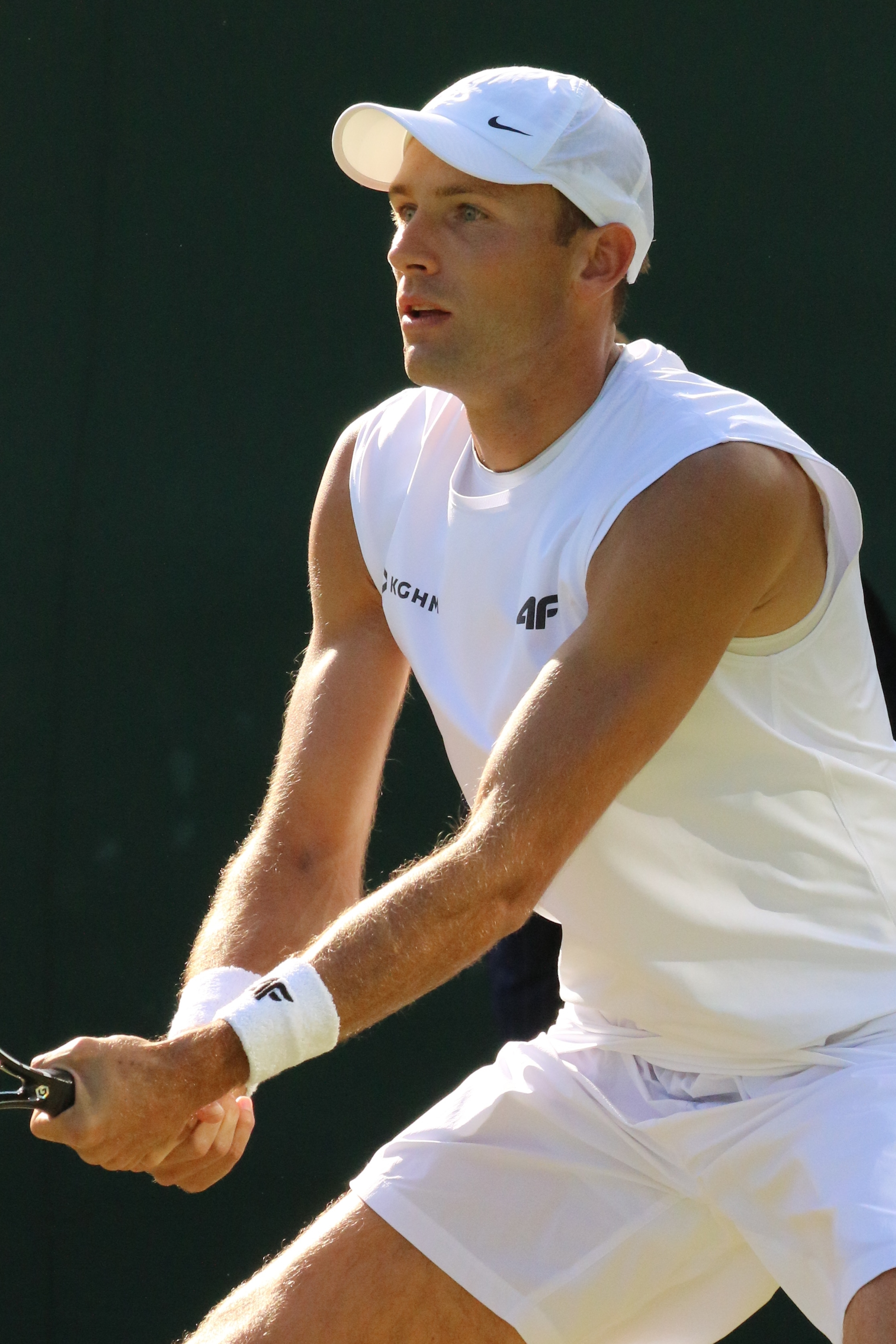
Kubot

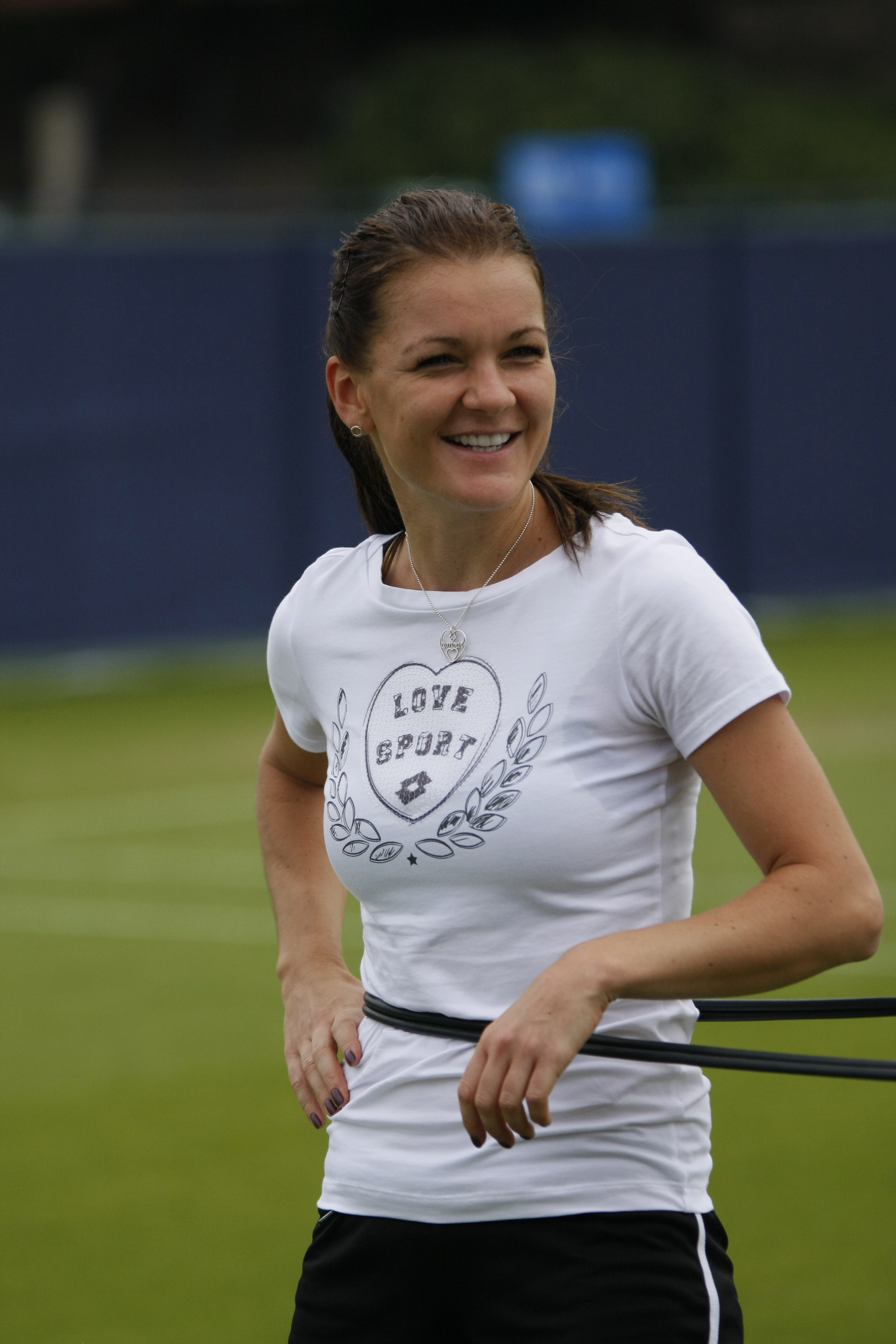
A. Radwańska

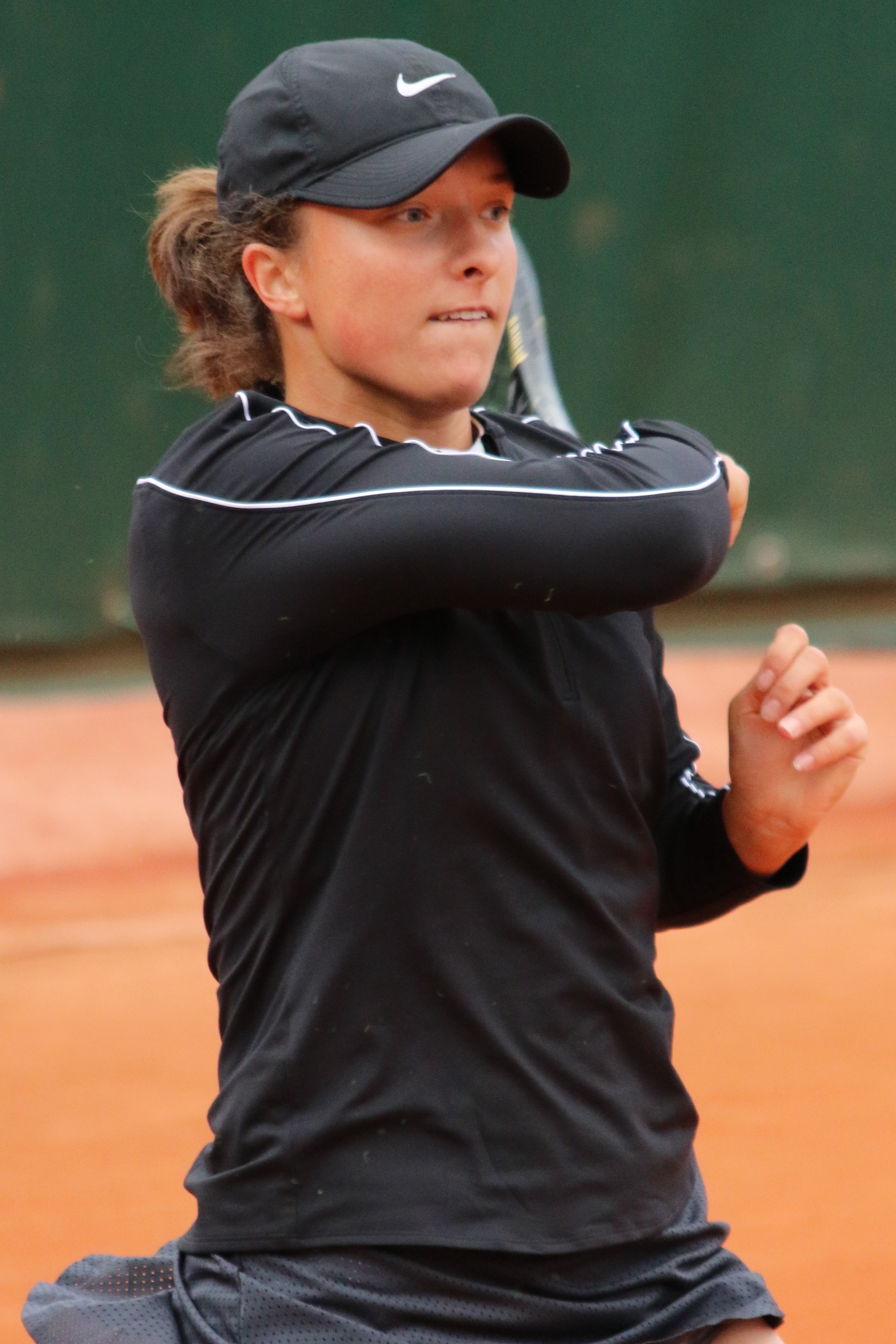
Świątek

== Volleyball ==
- Zbigniew Bartman
- Michał Bąkiewicz
- Mateusz Bieniek
- Agnieszka Bednarek-Kasza
- Izabela Bełcik
- Grzegorz Bociek
- Monika Bociek
- Rafał Buszek
- Fabian Drzyzga
- Tomasz Fornal
- Małgorzata Glinka-Mogentale
- Piotr Gruszka
- Krzysztof Ignaczak
- Jakub Jarosz
- Joanna Kaczor
- Łukasz Kadziewicz
- Karol Kłos
- Jakub Kochanowski
- Dawid Konarski
- Grzegorz Kosok
- Michał Kubiak
- Bartosz Kurek
- Bartosz Kwolek
- Wilfredo León
- Grzegorz Łomacz
- Mateusz Mika
- Joanna Mirek
- Marcin Możdżonek
- Agata Mróz-Olszewska
- Dawid Murek
- Piotr Nowakowski
- Paweł Papke
- Daniel Pliński
- Magdalena Sadowska
- Arie Selinger (born 1937)
- Kamil Semeniuk
- Katarzyna Skowrońska-Dolata
- Artur Szalpuk
- Aleksander Śliwka
- Sebastian Świderski
- Dorota Świeniewicz
- Hubert Wagner
- Anna Werblińska
- Michał Winiarski
- Mariusz Wlazły
- Tomasz Wójtowicz
- Andrzej Wrona
- Paweł Zagumny
- Paweł Zatorski
- Łukasz Żygadło
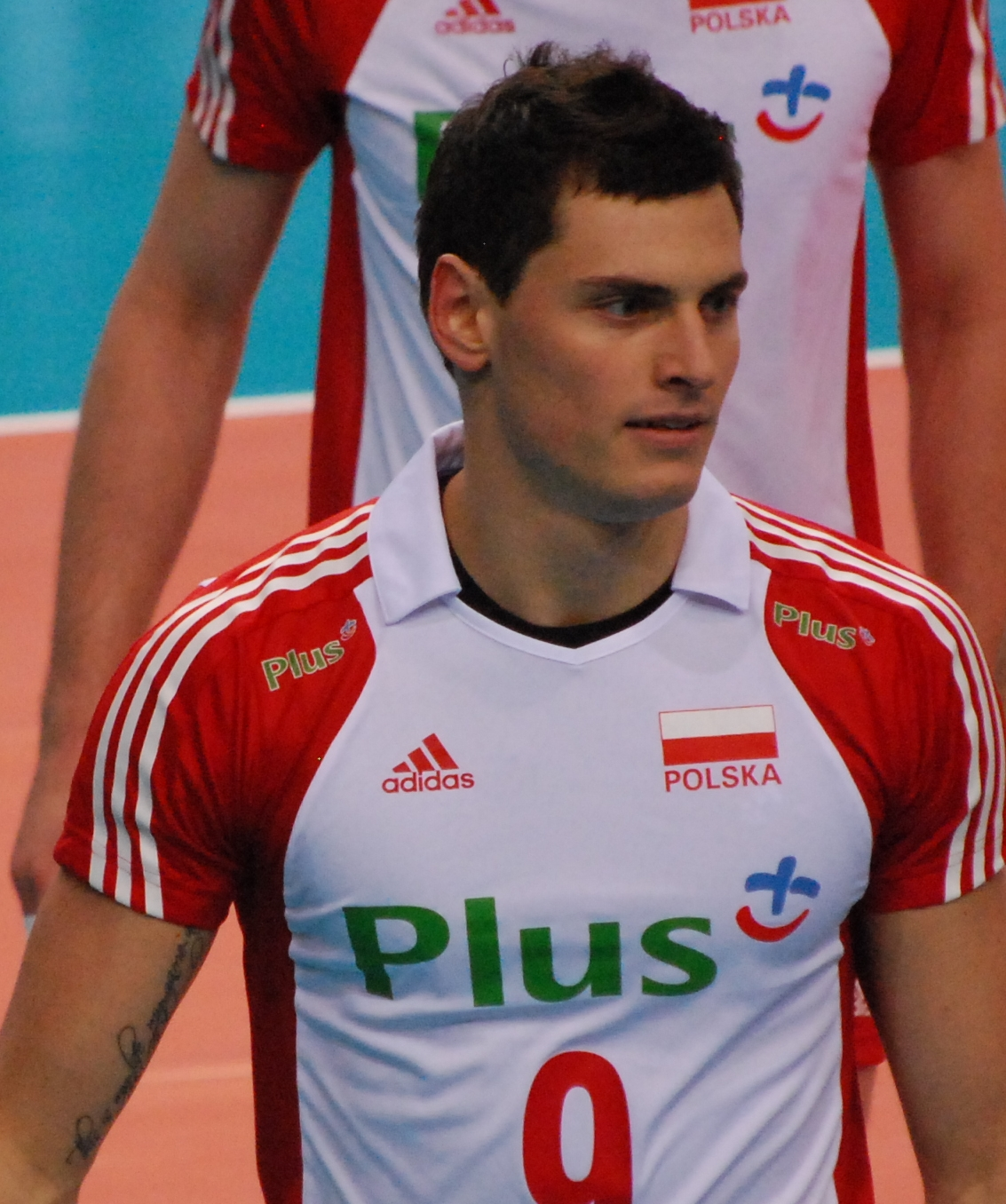
Bartman

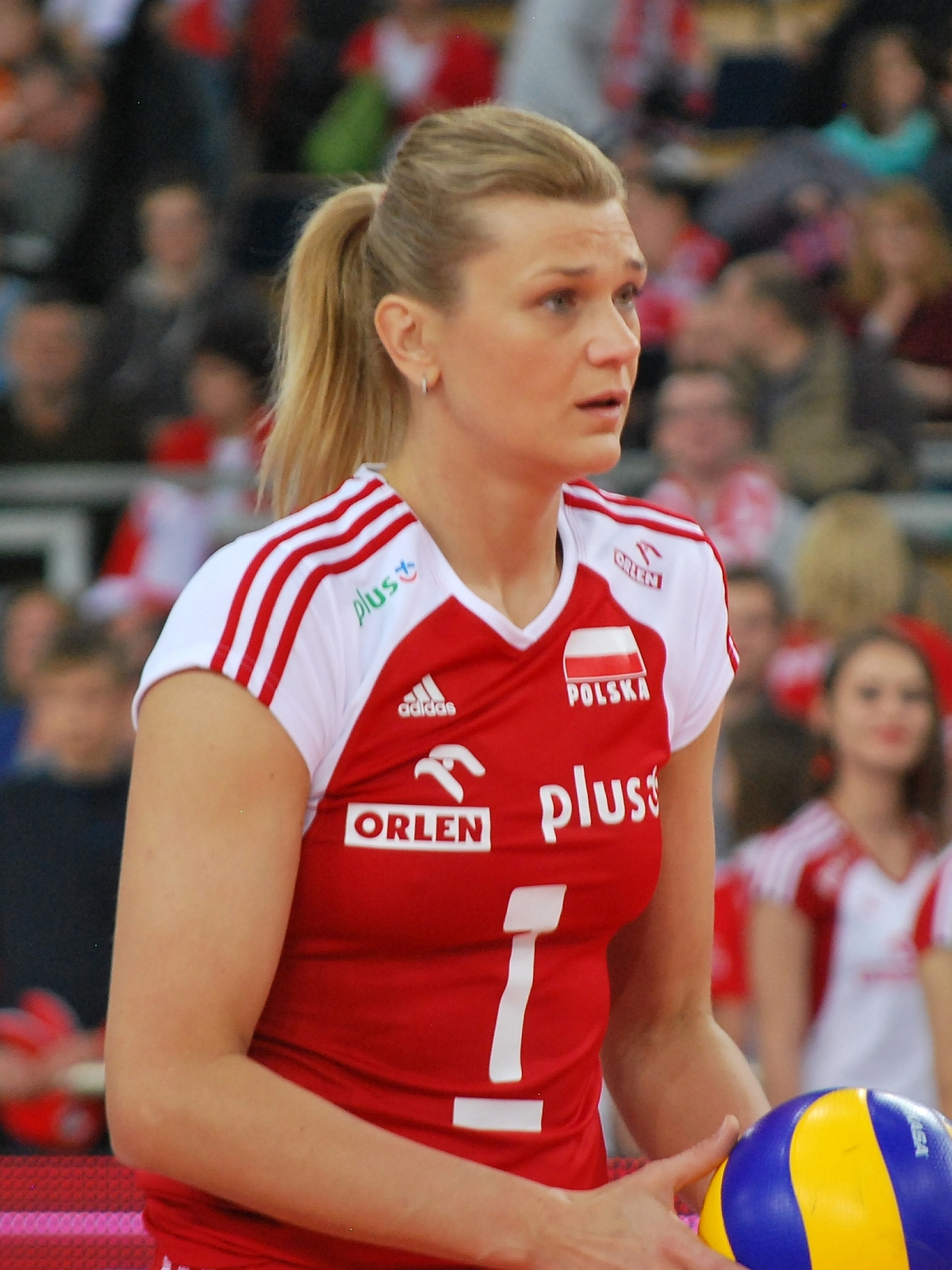
Glinka

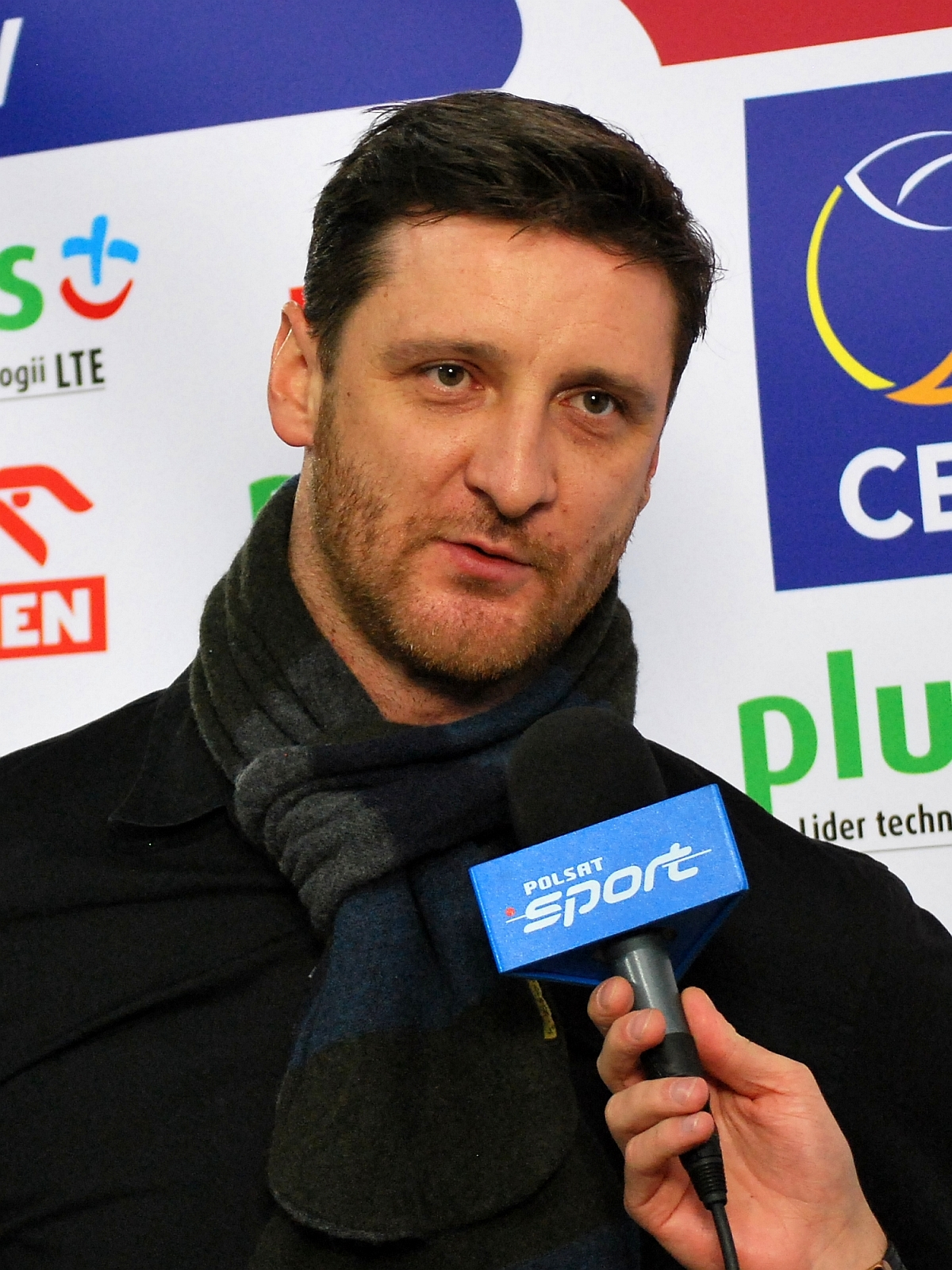
Gruszka

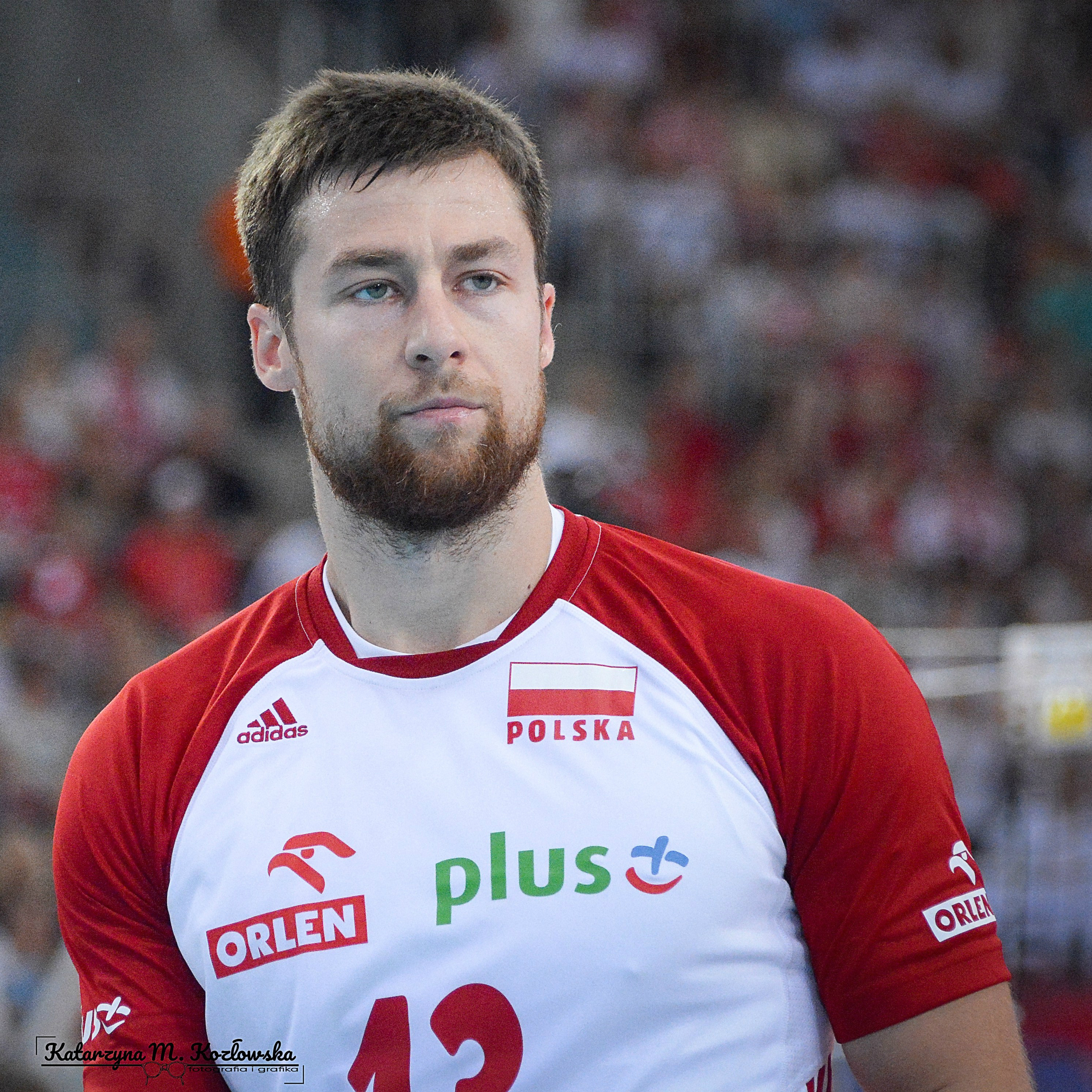
Kubiak

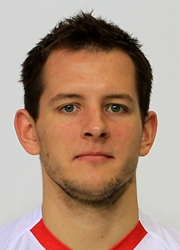
Kurek

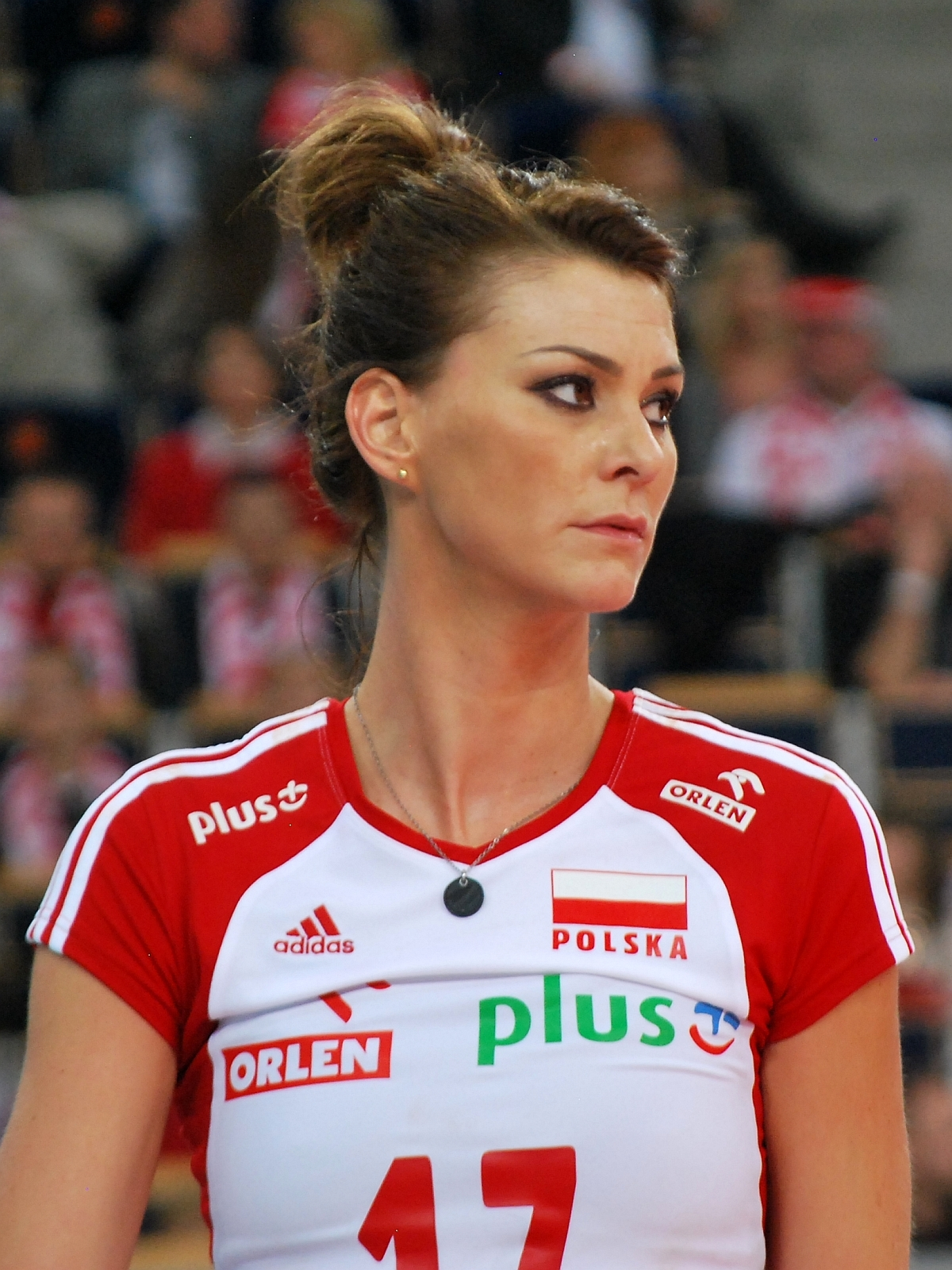
Skowrońska

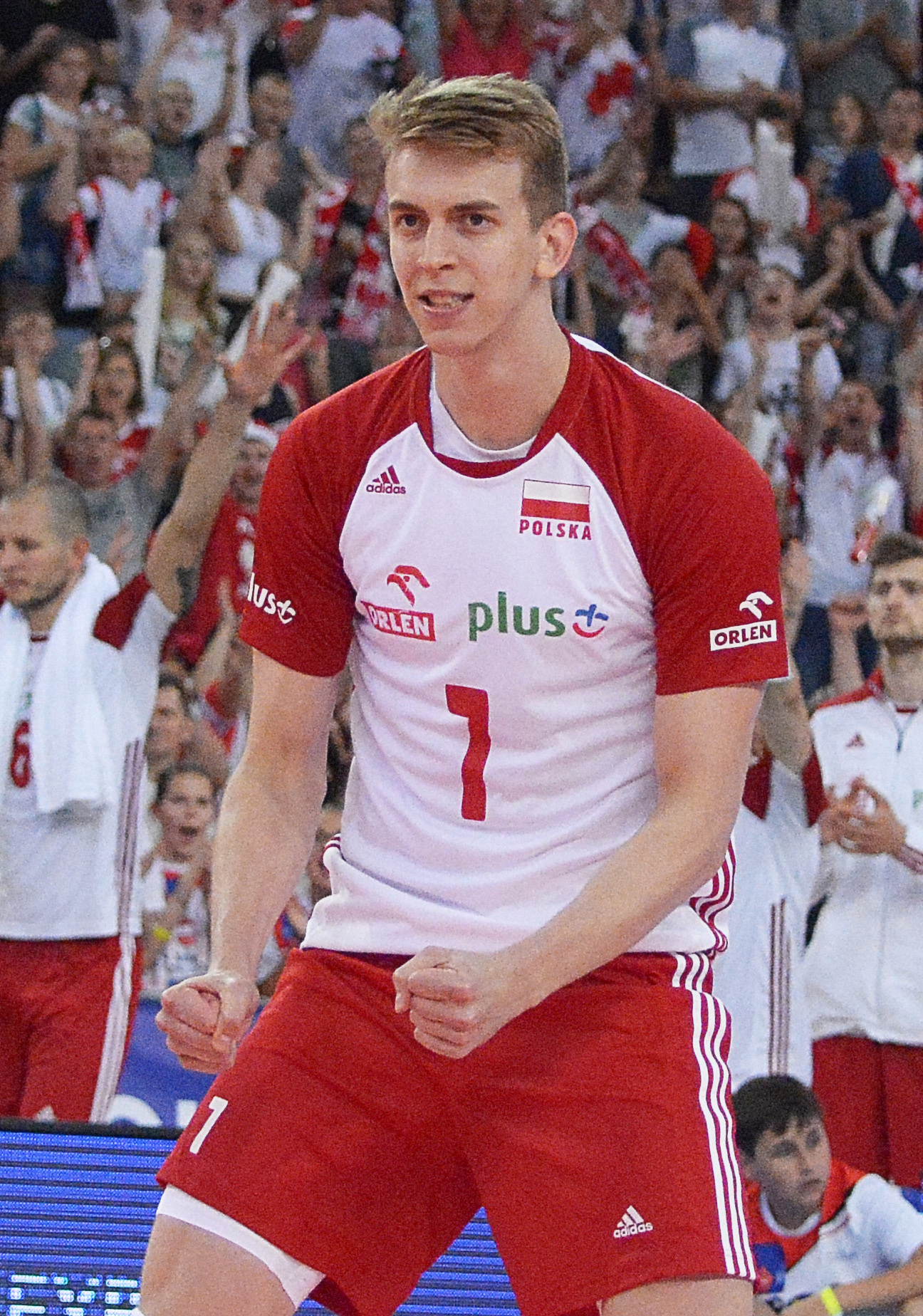
Szalpuk

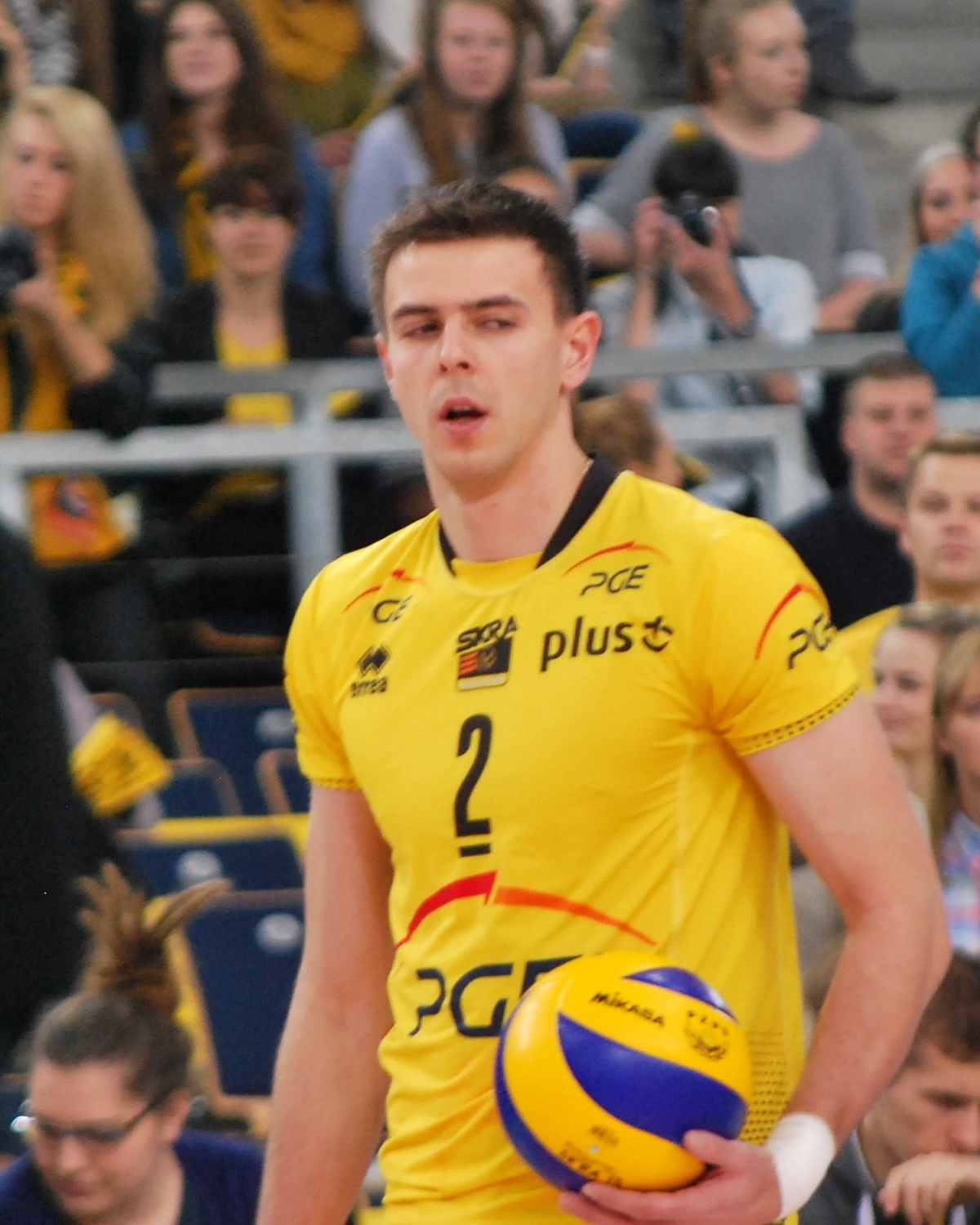
Wlazły

== Weightlifting ==
- Waldemar Baszanowski (1935–2011)
- Marcin Dołęga (born 1982)
- Ze'ev Friedman (1944–1972), flyweight weightlifter killed in the 1972 Munich Olympics massacre
- Ben Helfgott (1929–2023), Polish-born British
- Zbigniew Kaczmarek ( 1946–2023)
- Aleksandra Klejnowska (born 1982)
- Szymon Kołecki (born 1981)
- Andrzej Maszewski
- Mieczysław Nowak
- Norbert Ozimek
- Ireneusz Paliński
- Norbert Schemansky (1924–2016), American
- Zygmunt Smalcerz
- Marek Seweryn
- Stanley Stanczyk (1925–1997), American
- Agata Wróbel
- Adrian Zieliński
- Marian Zieliński (1929–2005)
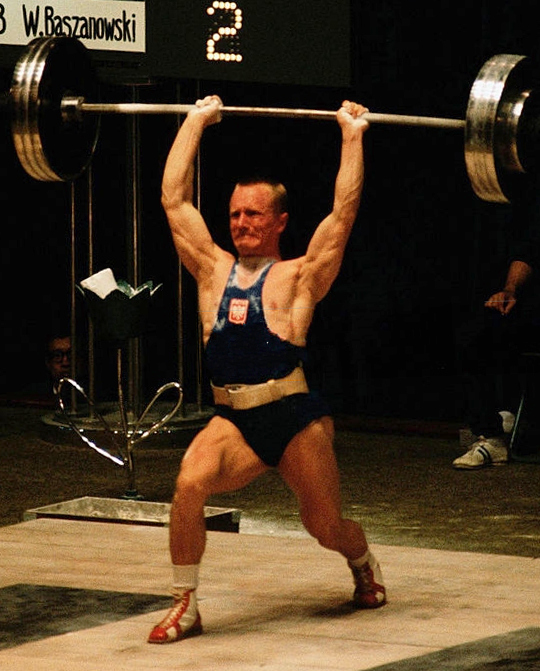
Baszanowski

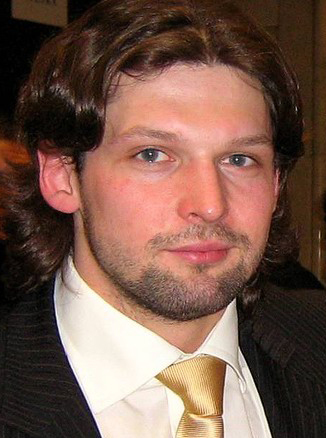
Kołecki

== Others sports ==
- Iwo Baraniewski, mixed martial arts
- Józef Bednarski, wrestling WWF
- Karol Bielecki, handball
- Leszek Blanik, gymnastics
- Jan Błachowicz, mixed martial arts
- Maciej Chorążyk, soccer official and sports journalist
- Janusz Centka, gliding
- Jarek Dymek, strongman
- Mateusz Gamrot, mixed martial arts
- Tomasz Gollob, Motorcycle speedway World Champion
- Andrzej Grubba, table tennis
- Sebastian Janikowski, American football
- Stan Javie, American football official
- Joanna Jędrzejczyk, mixed martial arts
- Stefan Kapłaniak, canoeing
- Sebastian Kawa, gliding
- Justin Koschitzke, former professional Australian rules footballer for St Kilda
- Karolina Kowalkiewicz, mixed martial arts
- Robert Kubica, Formula One and auto racing driver
- Tomasz Kucharski, rowing
- Mateusz Kusznierewicz, sailing
- Jerzy Makula, glider aerobatics
- Wiktor Malinowski, professional poker player
- Piotr Markiewicz, canoeing
- Renata Mauer, shooting
- Przemyslaw Mazur, auto racing
- Gene Mruczkowski, American football
- Scott Mruczkowski, American football
- Zofia Noceti-Klepacka, windsurfing
- Aneta Pastuszka, canoeing
- James Podsiadly, former professional Australian rules footballer for Adelaide and Geelong
- Mariusz Pudzianowski, strongman
- Ivan Putski, professional wrestler
- Helena Rakoczy, gymnastics
- Teresa Remiszewska (1928–2002), ocean sailor
- Arkadiusz Skrzypaszek, modern pentathlete
- Paul Slowinski, Muay Thai
- Adam Smelczyński, shooting
- Rafał Sonik, quad rally driver
- Robert Sycz, rowing
- Jerzy Szczakiel, Motorcycle speedway World Champion
- Sławomir Szmal, handball
- Marek Twardowski, canoeing
- Roger Verey, rowing
- Bogdan Wenta, handball
- Sebastian Wenta, strongman, highland games
- David Wojcinski, former professional Australian rules footballer for Geelong
- Jerzy Wojnar, luge
- Andrzej Wroński, wrestling
- Józef Zapędzki, shooting
- Sobiesław Zasada, auto racing
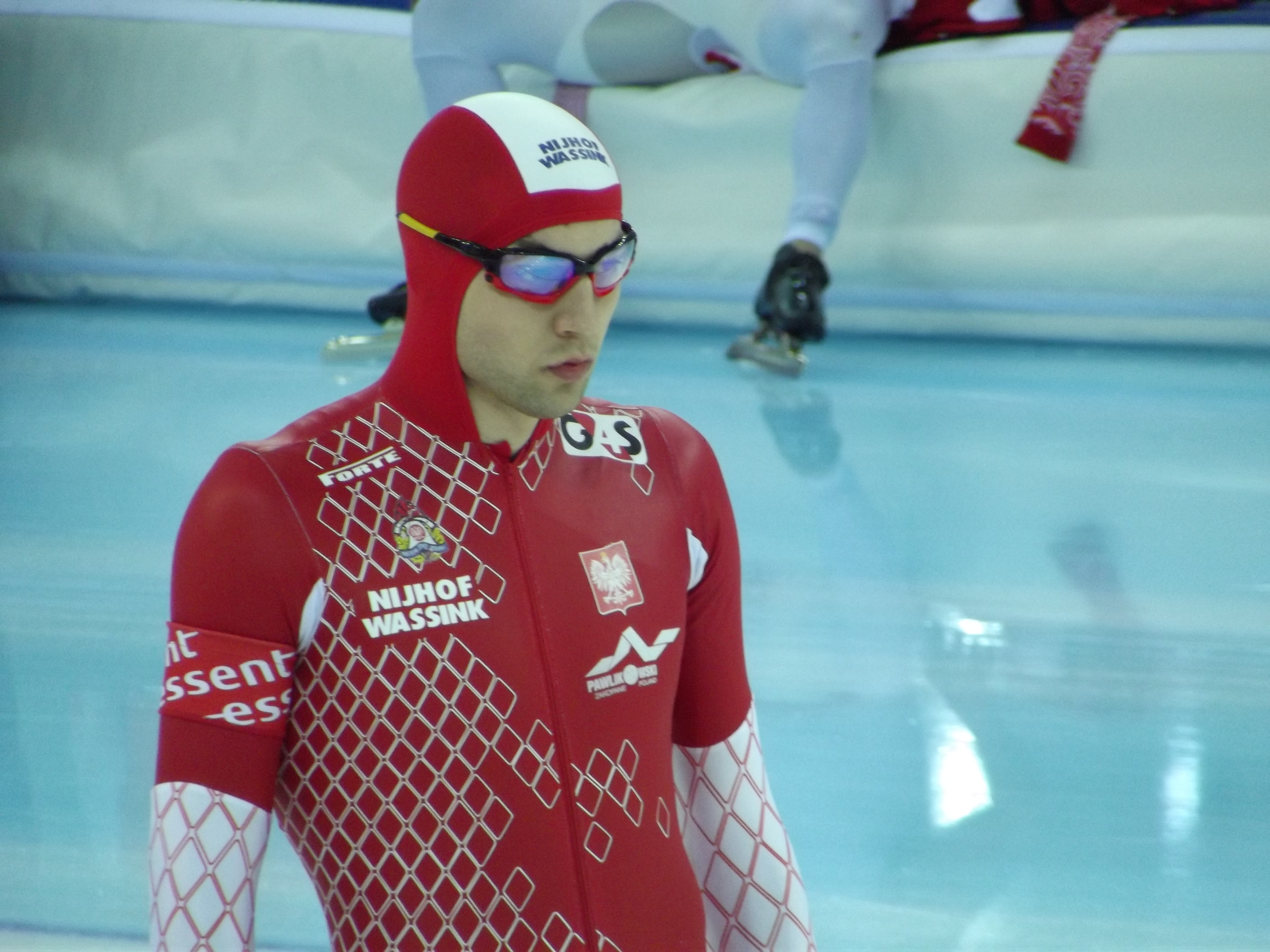
Bródka

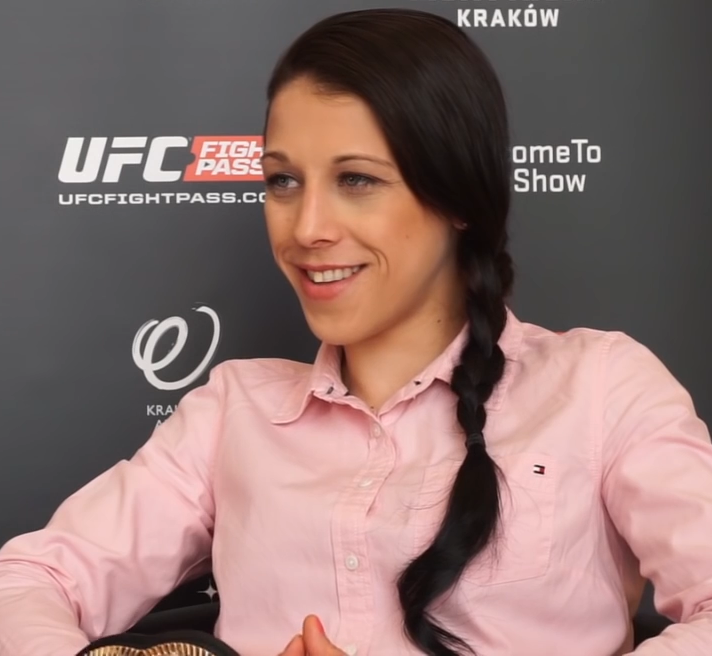
Jędrzejczyk

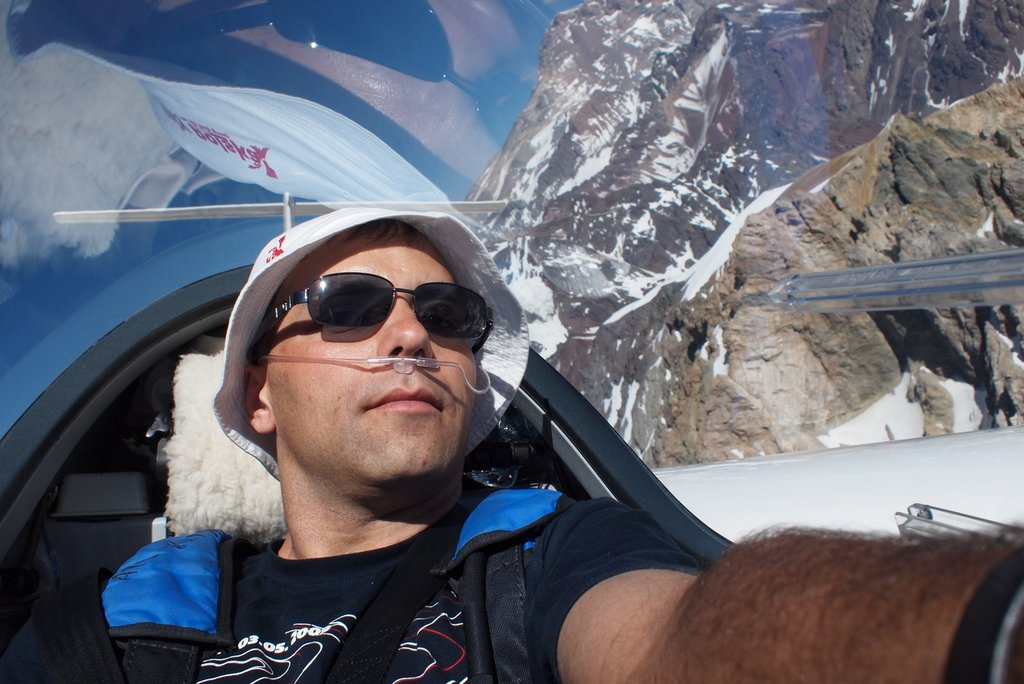
Kawa

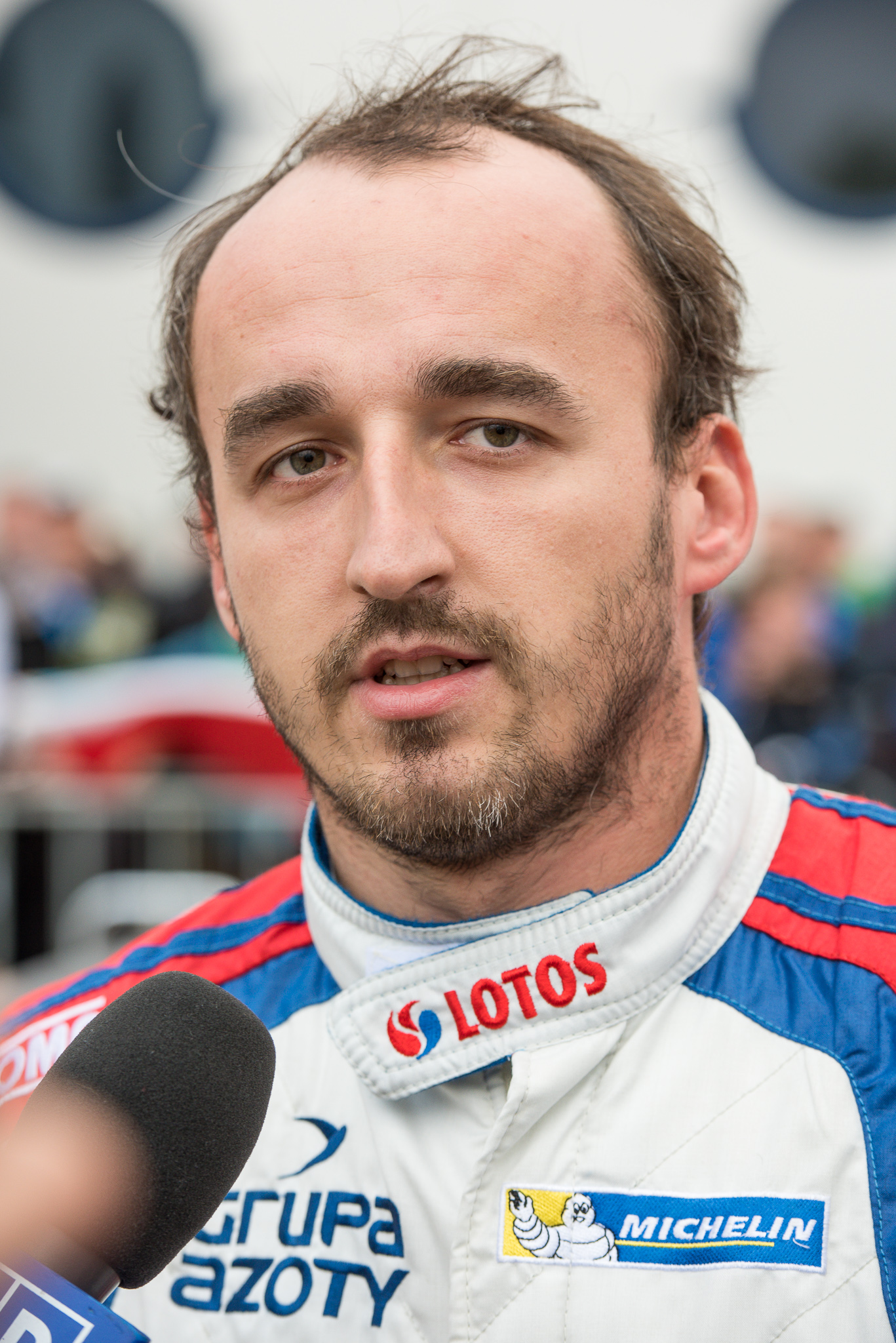
Kubica

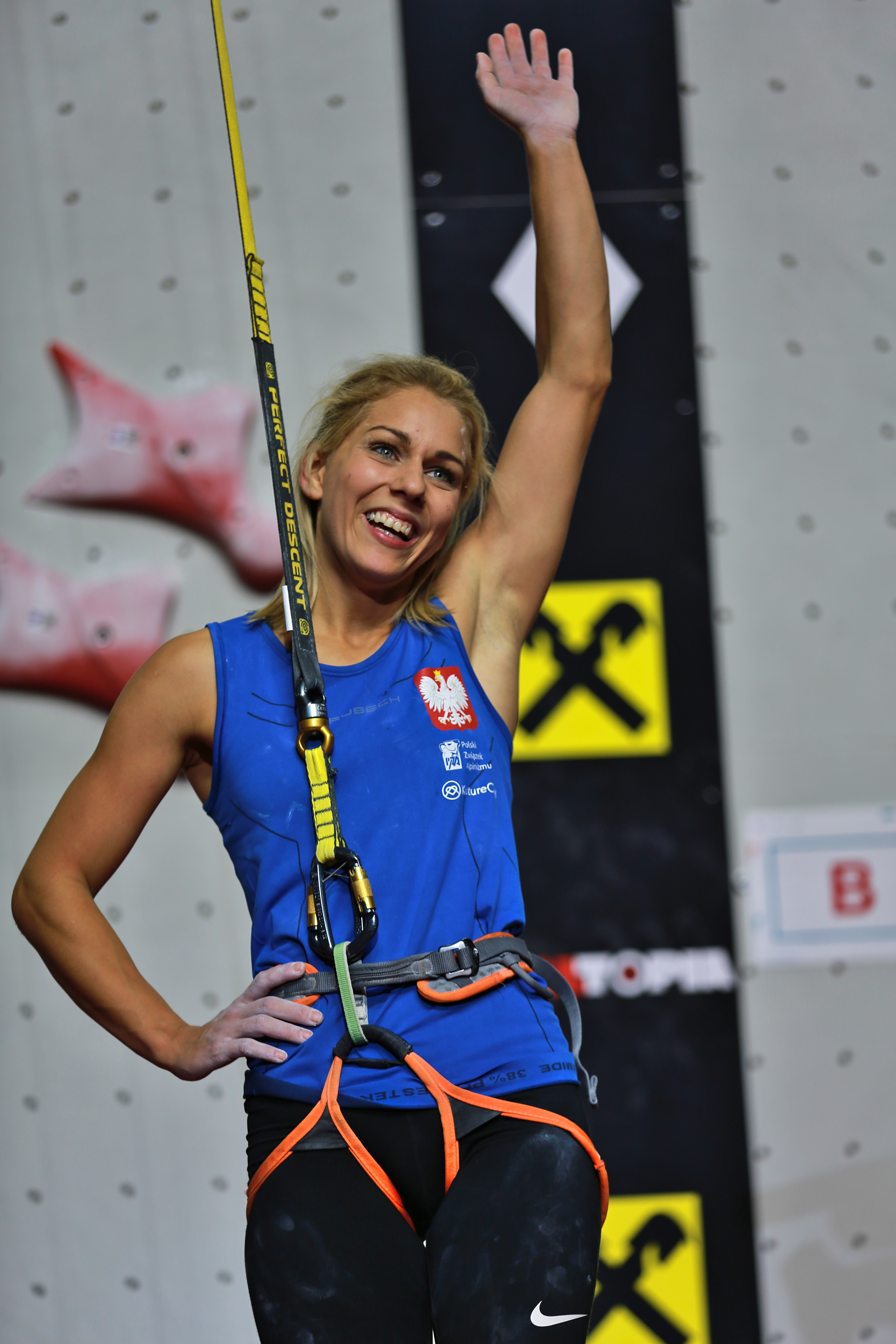
Mirosław

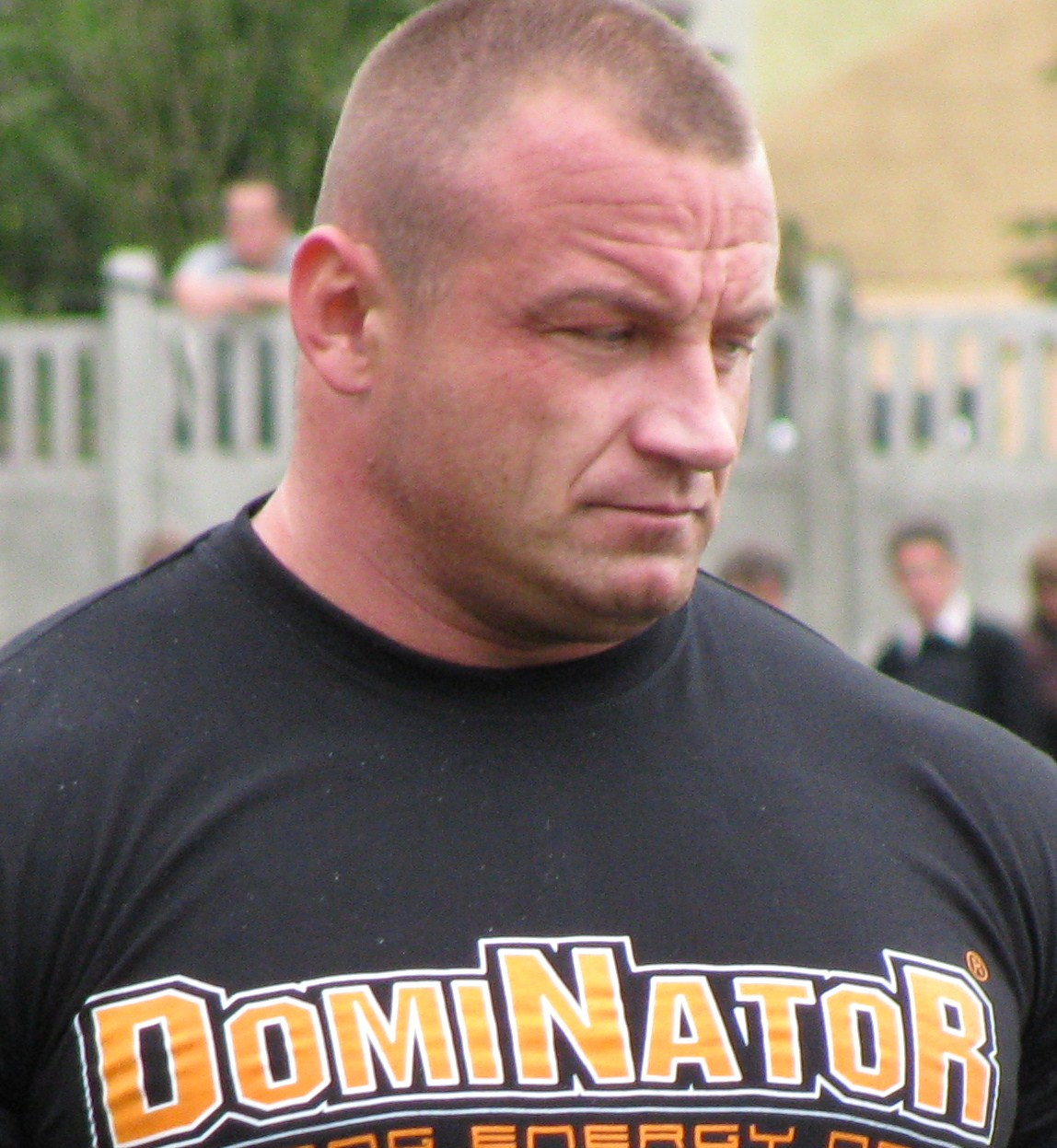
Pudzianowski

== See also ==
- List of Polish Americans
- List of Polish inventors and discoverers
- List of Polish Jews
- List of Polish Nobel laureates
- Poles
- Timeline of Polish science and technology
