= History of philosophy in Poland =

The history of philosophy in Poland parallels the evolution of philosophy in Europe in general.

== Overview ==
Polish philosophy drew upon the broader currents of European philosophy, and in turn contributed to their growth. Some of the most momentous Polish contributions came, in the thirteenth century, from the Scholastic philosopher and scientist Vitello, and, in the sixteenth century, from the Renaissance polymath Nicolaus Copernicus.

Subsequently, the Polish–Lithuanian Commonwealth partook in the intellectual ferment of the Enlightenment, which for the multi-ethnic Commonwealth ended not long after the 1772-1795 partitions and political annihilation that would last for the next 123 years, until the collapse of the three partitioning empires in World War I.

The period of Messianism, between the November 1830 and January 1863 Uprisings, reflected European Romantic and Idealist trends, as well as a Polish yearning for political resurrection. It was a period of maximalist metaphysical systems.

The collapse of the January 1863 Uprising prompted an agonizing reappraisal of Poland's situation. Poles gave up their earlier practice of "measuring their resources by their aspirations" and buckled down to hard work and study. "[A] Positivist", wrote the novelist Bolesław Prus' friend, Julian Ochorowicz, was "anyone who bases assertions on verifiable evidence; who does not express himself categorically about doubtful things, and does not speak at all about those that are inaccessible."

The twentieth century brought a new quickening to Polish philosophy. There was growing interest in western philosophical currents. Rigorously-trained Polish philosophers made substantial contributions to specialized fields—to psychology, the history of philosophy, the theory of knowledge, and especially mathematical logic. Jan Łukasiewicz gained world fame with his concept of many-valued logic and his "Polish notation." Alfred Tarski's work in truth theory won him world renown.

After World War II, for over four decades, world-class Polish philosophers and historians of philosophy such as Władysław Tatarkiewicz continued their work, often in the face of adversities occasioned by the dominance of a politically enforced official philosophy. The phenomenologist Roman Ingarden did influential work in esthetics and in a Husserl-style metaphysics; his student Karol Wojtyła acquired a unique influence on the world stage as Pope John Paul II.

== Scholasticism ==
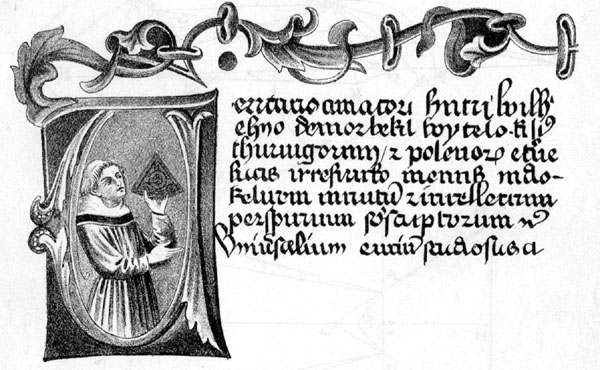
Page from a manuscript of De perspectiva, with miniature of its author Vitello

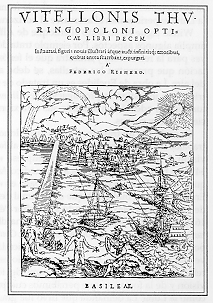
Cover of Vitellonis Thuringopoloni opticae libri decem (Ten Books of Optics by the Thuringo-Pole Vitello)

The formal history of philosophy in Poland may be said to have begun in the fifteenth century, following the revival of the University of Kraków by King Władysław II Jagiełło in 1400.

The true beginnings of Polish philosophy, however, reach back to the thirteenth century and Vitello (c. 1230 – c. 1314), a Silesian born to a Polish mother and a Thuringian settler, a contemporary of Thomas Aquinas who had spent part of his life in Italy at centers of the highest intellectual culture. In addition to being a philosopher, he was a scientist who specialized in optics. His famous treatise, Perspectiva, while drawing on the Arabic Book of Optics by Alhazen, was unique in Latin literature, and in turn helped inspire Roger Bacon's best work, Part V of his Opus maius, "On Perspectival Science," as well as his supplementary treatise On the Multiplication of Vision. Vitello's Perspectiva additionally made important contributions to psychology: it held that vision per se apprehends only colors and light while all else, particularly the distance and size of objects, is established by means of association and unconscious deduction.

Vitello's concept of being was one rare in the Middle Ages, neither Augustinian as among conservatives nor Aristotelian as among progressives, but Neoplatonist. It was an emanationist concept that held radiation to be the prime characteristic of being, and ascribed to radiation the nature of light. This "metaphysic of light" inclined Vitello to optical research, or perhaps vice versa his optical studies led to his metaphysic.

According to the Polish historian of philosophy, Władysław Tatarkiewicz, no Polish philosopher since Vitello has enjoyed so eminent a European standing as this thinker who belonged, in a sense, to the prehistory of Polish philosophy.

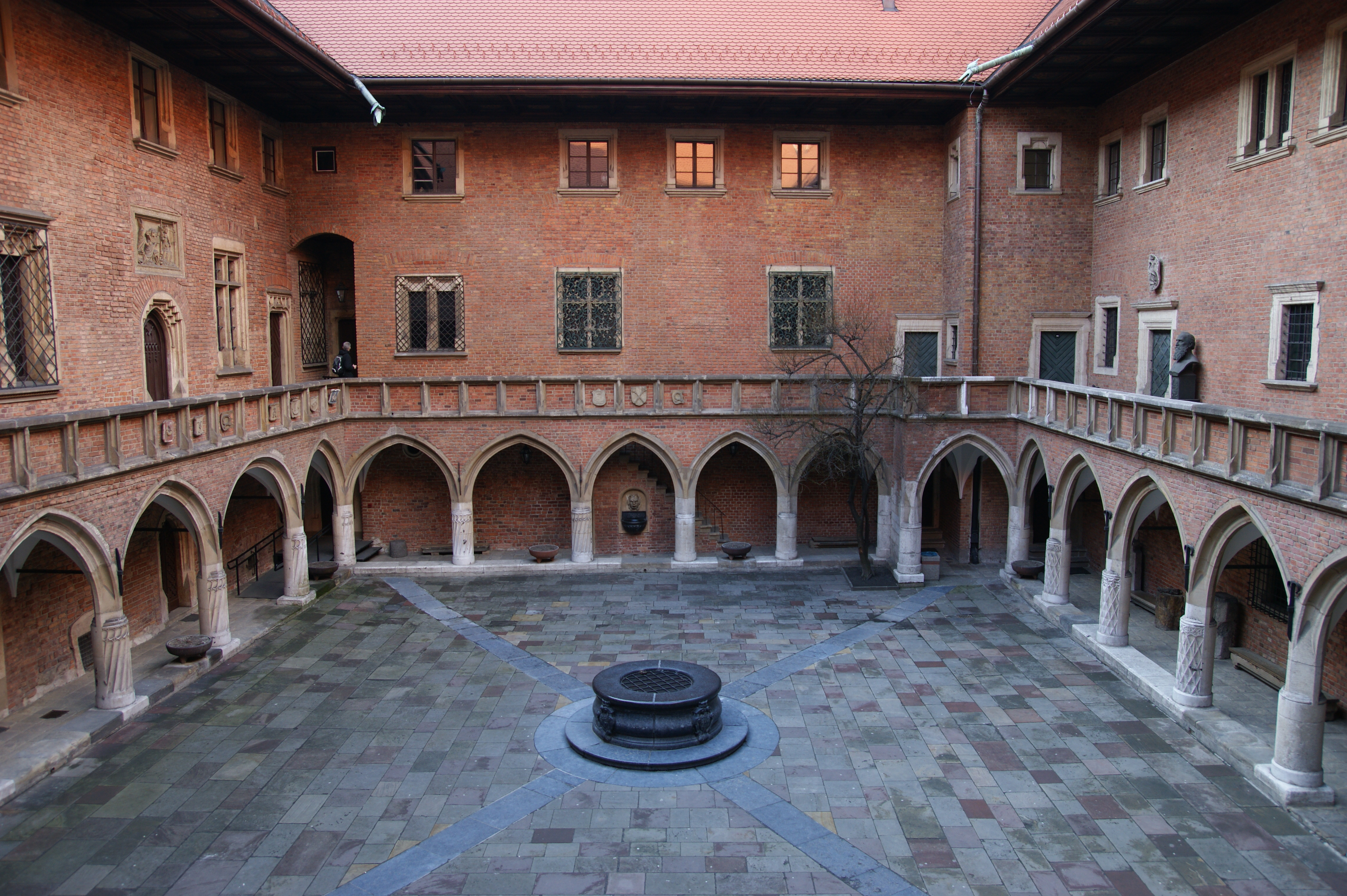
Courtyard of Kraków University's Collegium Maius, a site of Polish higher learning since 1400

From the beginning of the fifteenth century, Polish philosophy, centered at Kraków University, pursued a normal course. It no longer harbored exceptional thinkers such as Vitello, but it did feature representatives of all wings of mature Scholasticism, via antiqua as well as via moderna.

The first of these to reach Kraków was via moderna, then the more widespread movement in Europe. In physics, logic and ethics, Terminism (Nominalism) prevailed in Kraków, under the influence of the French Scholastic, Jean Buridan (died c. 1359), who had been rector of the University of Paris and an exponent of views of William of Ockham. Buridan had formulated the theory of "impetus"—the force that causes a body, once set in motion, to persist in motion—and stated that impetus is proportional to the speed of, and amount of matter comprising, a body: Buridan thus anticipated Galileo and Isaac Newton. His theory of impetus was momentous in that it also explained the motions of celestial bodies without resort to the spirits—"intelligentiae"—to which the Peripatetics (followers of Aristotle) had ascribed those motions. At Kraków, physics was now expounded by (St.) Jan Kanty (1390–1473), who developed this concept of "impetus."

A general trait of the Kraków Scholastics was a provlivity for compromise—for reconciling Nominalism with the older tradition. For example, the Nominalist, Benedict Hesse, while in principle accepting the theory of impetus, did not apply it to the heavenly spheres.

In the second half of the fifteenth century, at Kraków, via antiqua became dominant. Nominalism retreated, and the old Scholasticism triumphed.

In this period, Thomism had its chief center at Cologne, whence it influenced Kraków. Cologne, formerly the home ground of Albertus Magnus, had preserved Albert's mode of thinking. Thus the Cologne philosophers formed two wings, the Thomist and Albertist, and even Cologne's Thomists showed Neoplatonist traits characteristic of Albert, affirming emanation, a hierarchy of being, and a metaphysic of light.

The chief Kraków adherents of the Cologne-style Thomism included Jan of Głogów (c. 1445 – 1507) and Jakub of Gostynin (c. 1454 – 1506). Another, purer teacher of Thomism was Michał Falkener of Wrocław (c. 1450 – 1534).

Almost at the same time, Scotism appeared in Poland, having been brought from Paris first by Michał Twaróg of Bystrzyków (c. 1450 – 1520). Twaróg had studied at Paris in 1473–77, in the period when, following the anathematization of the Nominalists (1473), the Scotist school was there enjoying its greatest triumphs. A prominent student of Twaróg's, Jan of Stobnica (c. 1470 – 1519), was already a moderate Scotist who took account of the theories of the Ockhamists, Thomists and Humanists.

When Nominalism was revived in western Europe at the turn of the sixteenth century, particularly thanks to Jacques Lefèvre d'Étaples (Faber Stapulensis), it presently reappeared in Kraków and began taking the upper hand there once more over Thomism and Scotism. It was reintroduced particularly by Lefèvre's pupil, Jan Szylling, a native of Kraków who had studied at Paris in the opening years of the sixteenth century. Another follower of Lefèvre's was Grzegorz of Stawiszyn, a Kraków professor who, beginning in 1510, published the Frenchman's works at Kraków.

Thus Poland had made its appearance as a separate philosophical center only at the turn of the fifteenth century, at a time when the creative period of Scholastic philosophy had already passed. Throughout the fifteenth century, Poland harbored all the currents of Scholasticism. The advent of Humanism in Poland would find a Scholasticism more vigorous than in other countries. Indeed, Scholasticism would survive the 16th and 17th centuries and even part of the 18th at Kraków and Wilno Universities and at numerous Jesuit, Dominican and Franciscan colleges.

To be sure, in the sixteenth century, with the arrival of the Renaissance, Scholasticism would enter upon a decline; but during the 17th century's Counter-Reformation, and even into the early 18th century, Scholasticism would again become Poland's chief philosophy.

== Renaissance ==
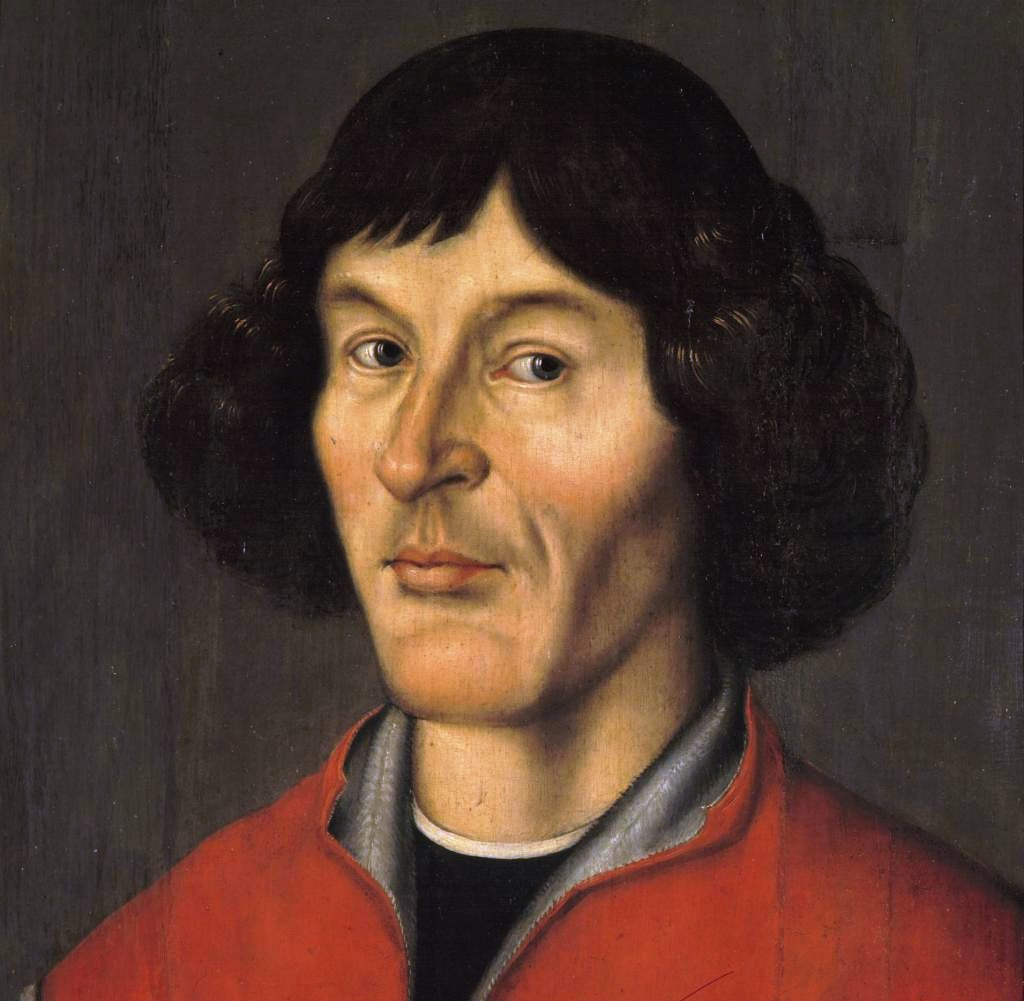
Nicolaus Copernicus

Copernicus' De revolutionibus, 1543. Click on image to read book.

The spirit of Humanism, which had reached Poland by the middle of the fifteenth century, was not very "philosophical." Rather, it lent its stimulus to linguistic studies, political thought, and scientific research. But these manifested a philosophical attitude different from that of the previous period.

Empirical natural science had flourished at Kraków as early as the fifteenth century, side by side with speculative philosophy. The most perfect product of this blossoming was Nicolaus Copernicus (1473–1543, Polish: Mikołaj Kopernik). He was not only a scientist but a philosopher. According to Tatarkiewicz, he may have been the greatest—in any case, the most renowned—philosopher that Poland ever produced. He drew the inspiration for his cardinal discovery from philosophy; he had become acquainted through Marsilio Ficino with the philosophies of Plato and the Pythagoreans; and through the writings of the philosophers Cicero and Plutarch he had learned about the ancients who had declared themselves in favor of the Earth's movement.

Copernicus may also have been influenced by Kraków philosophy: during his studies there, Terminist physics had been taught, with special emphasis on "impetus." His own thinking was guided by philosophical considerations. He arrived at the heliocentric thesis (as he was to write in a youthful treatise) "ratione postea equidem sensu": it was not observation but the discovery of a logical contradiction in Ptolemy's system, that served him as a point of departure that led to the new astronomy. In his dedication to Pope Paul III, he submitted his work for judgment by "philosophers."

In its turn, Copernicus' theory transformed man's view of the structure of the universe, and of the place held in it by the earth and by man, and thus attained a far-reaching philosophical importance.

Copernicus was involved not only in natural science and natural philosophy but also—by his postulation of a quantity theory of money and of "Gresham's law" (in the year, 1519, of Thomas Gresham's birth)—in the philosophy of man.

In the early sixteenth century, Plato, who had become a model for philosophy in Italy, especially in Medicean Florence, was represented in Poland in some ways by Adam of Łowicz, author of Conversations about Immortality.

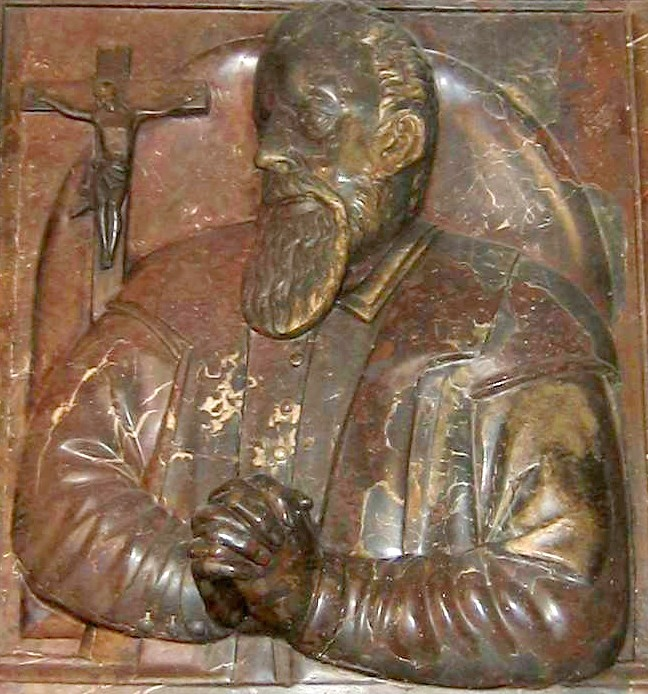
Sebastian Petrycy's tomb effigy, Kraków

Generally speaking, though, Poland remained Aristotelian. Sebastian Petrycy of Pilzno (1554–1626) laid stress, in the theory of knowledge, on experiment and induction; and in psychology, on feeling and will; while in politics he preached democratic ideas. Petrycy's central feature was his linking of philosophical theory with the requirements of practical national life. In 1601–18, a period when translations into modern languages were still rarities, he accomplished Polish translations of Aristotle's practical works. With Petrycy, vernacular Polish philosophical terminology began to develop not much later than did the French and German.

Yet another Renaissance current, the new Stoicism, was represented in Poland by Jakub Górski (c. 1525 – 1585), author of a famous Dialectic (1563) and of many works in grammar, rhetoric, theology and sociology. He tended toward eclecticism, attempting to reconcile the Stoics with Aristotle.

A later, purer representative of Stoicism in Poland was Adam Burski (c. 1560 – 1611), author of a Dialectica Ciceronis (1604) boldly proclaiming Stoic sensualism and empiricism and—before Francis Bacon—urging the use of inductive method.

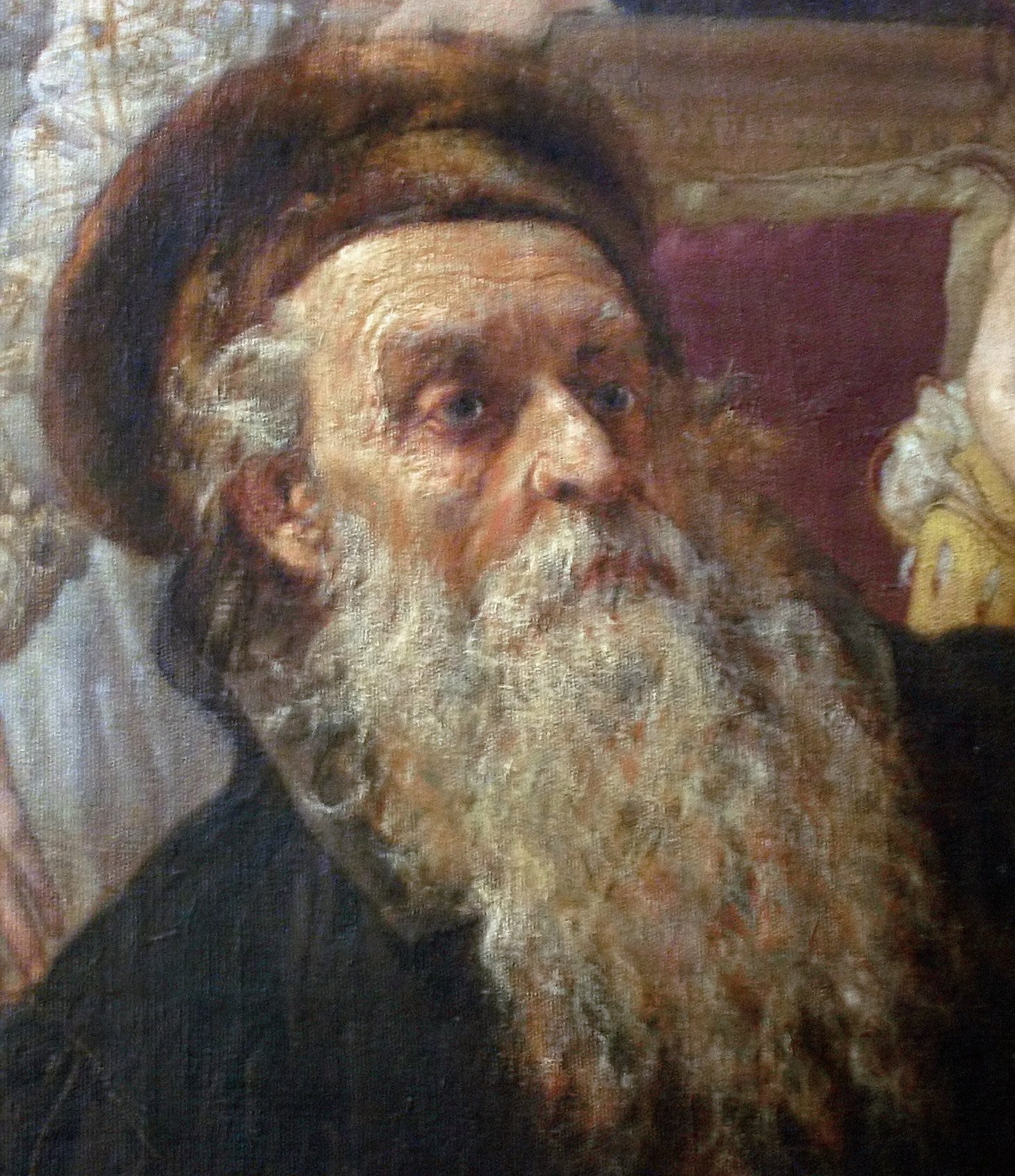
Andrzej Frycz Modrzewski

A star among the pleiade of progressive political philosophers during the Polish Renaissance was Andrzej Frycz Modrzewski (1503–72), who advocated on behalf of equality for all before the law, the accountability of monarch and government to the nation, and social assistance for the weak and disadvantaged. His chief work was De Republica emendanda (On Reform of the Republic, 1551–54).

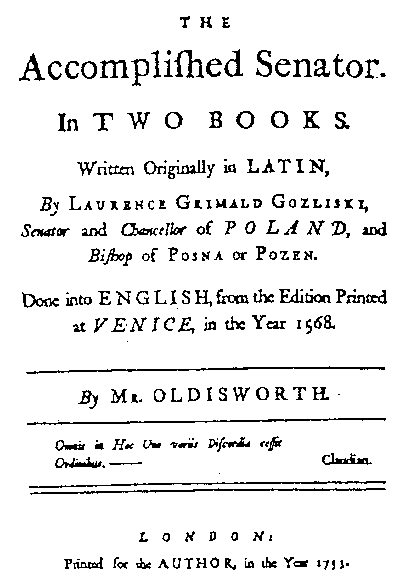
1733 English translation of Goślicki's De optimo senatore

Another notable political thinker was Wawrzyniec Grzymała Goślicki (1530–1607), best known in Poland and abroad for his book De optimo senatore (The Accomplished Senator, 1568). It propounded the view—which for long got the book banned in England, as subversive of monarchy—that a ruler may legitimately govern only with the sufferance of the people.

After the first decades of the 17th century, the wars, invasions and internal dissensions that beset the Polish–Lithuanian Commonwealth, brought a decline in philosophy. If in the ensuing period there was independent philosophical thought, it was among the religious dissenters, particularly the Polish Arians, also known variously as Antitrinitarians, Socinians, and Polish Brethren—forerunners of the British and American Socinians, Unitarians and Deists who were to figure prominently in the intellectual and political currents of the 17th, 18th and 19th centuries.

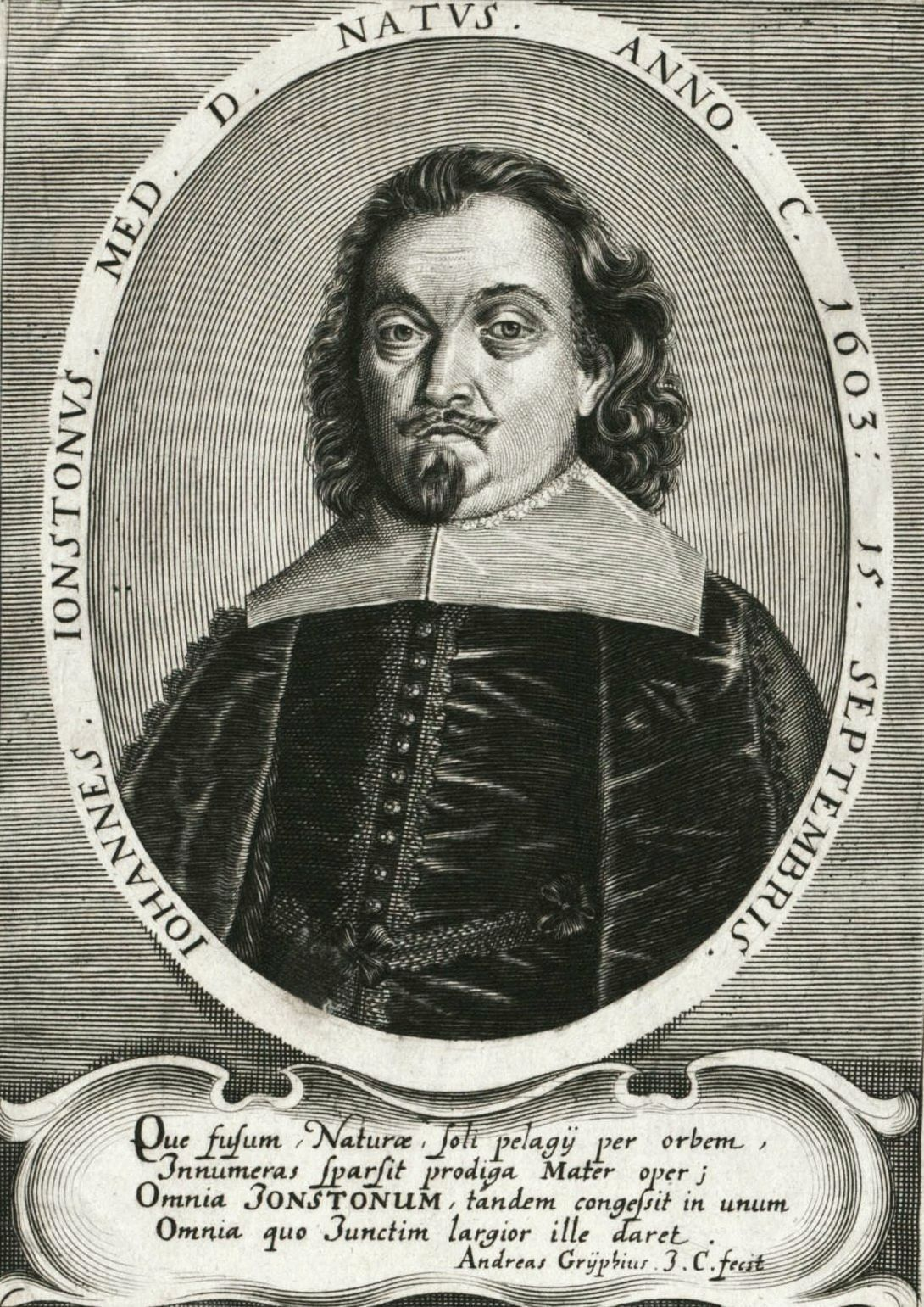
Jan Jonston

The Polish dissenters created an original ethical theory radically condemning evil and violence. Centers of intellectual life such as that at Leszno hosted notable thinkers such as the Czech pedagogue, Jan Amos Komensky (Comenius), and the Pole, Jan Jonston. Jonston was tutor and physician to the Leszczyński family, a devotee of Bacon and experimental knowledge, and author of Naturae constantia, published in Amsterdam in 1632, whose geometrical method and naturalistic, almost pantheistic concept of the world may have influenced Benedict Spinoza.

The Leszczyński family itself would produce an 18th-century Polish-Lithuanian king, Stanisław Leszczyński (1677–1766; reigned in the Polish–Lithuanian Commonwealth 1704–11 and again 1733–36), "le philosophe bienfaisant" ("the beneficent philosopher")—in fact, an independent thinker whose views on culture were in advance of Jean-Jacques Rousseau's, and who was the first to introduce into Polish intellectual life on a large scale the French influences that were later to become so strong.

In 1689, in an exceptional miscarriage of justice, a Polish ex-Jesuit philosopher, Kazimierz Łyszczyński, author of a manuscript treatise, De non existentia Dei (On the Non-existence of God), was accused of atheism by a priest who was his debtor, was convicted, and was executed in most brutal fashion.

== Enlightenment ==
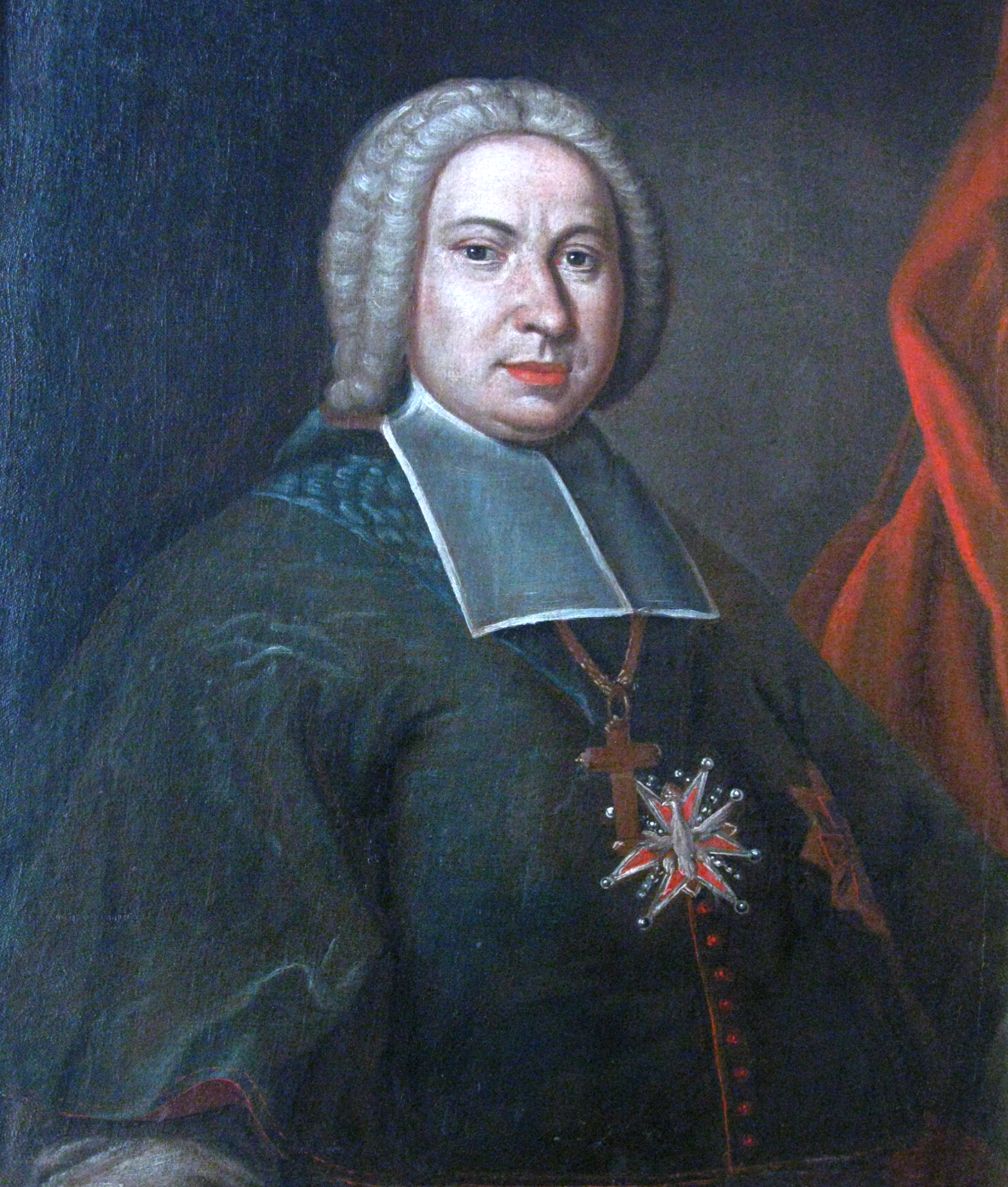
Andrzej Stanisław Załuski

After a decline of a century and a half, in the mid-18th century, Polish philosophy began to revive. The hub of this movement was Warsaw. While Poland's capital then had no institution of higher learning, neither were those of Kraków, Zamość or Wilno any longer agencies of progress. The initial impetus for the revival came from religious thinkers: from members of the Piarist and other teaching orders. A leading patron of the new ideas was Bishop Andrzej Stanisław Załuski.

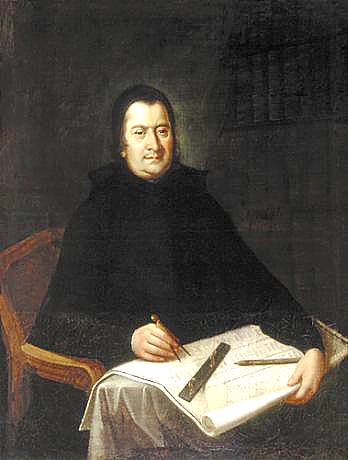
Stanisław Konarski

Scholasticism, which until then had dominated Polish philosophy, was followed by the Enlightenment. Initially the major influence was Christian Wolff and, indirectly, Gottfried Wilhelm Leibniz. The Polish–Lithuanian Commonwealth's elected king, August III the Saxon, and the relations between Poland and her neighbor, Saxony, heightened the German influence. Wolff's doctrine was brought to Warsaw in 1740 by the Theatine, Portalupi; from 1743, its chief Polish champion was Wawrzyniec Mitzler de Kolof (1711–78), court physician to August III.

Under the Polish–Lithuanian Commonwealth's last king, Stanisław August Poniatowski (reigned 1764–95), the Polish Enlightenment was radicalized and came under French influence. The philosophical foundation of the movement ceased to be the Rationalist doctrine of Wolff and became the Sensualism of Condillac. This spirit pervaded Poland's Commission of National Education, which completed the reforms begun by the Piarist priest, Stanisław Konarski. The commission's members were in touch with the French Encyclopedists and freethinkers, with d'Alembert and Condorcet, Condillac and Rousseau. The commission abolished school instruction in theology, even in philosophy.

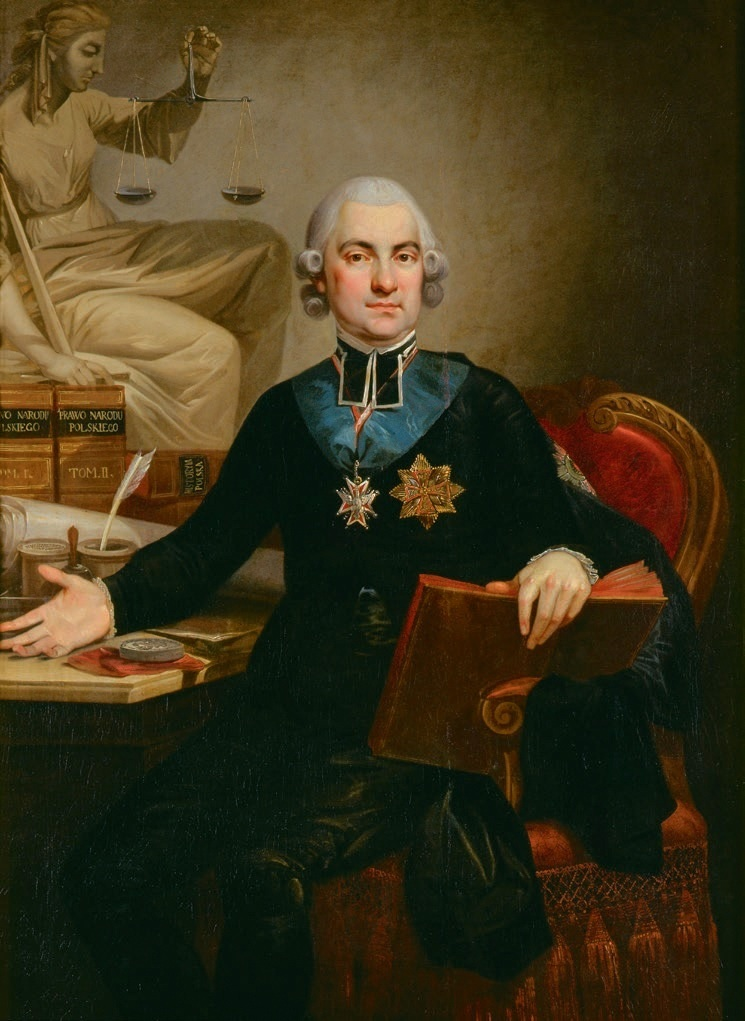
Hugo Kołłątaj

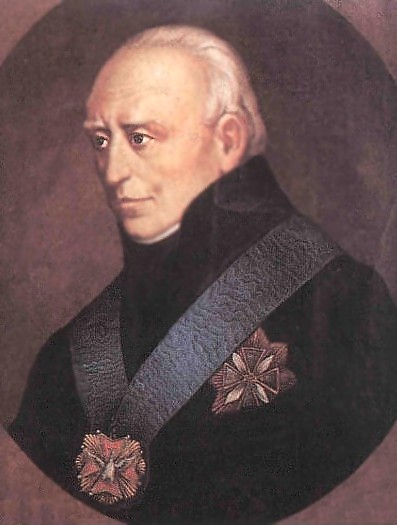
Stanisław Staszic

This empiricist and positivist Enlightenment philosophy produced several outstanding Polish thinkers. Although active in the reign of Stanisław August Poniatowski, they published their chief works only after the loss of the Polish–Lithuanian Commonwealth's independence in 1795. The most important of these figures were Jan Śniadecki, Stanisław Staszic and Hugo Kołłątaj.

Another adherent of this empirical Enlightenment philosophy was the minister of education under the Duchy of Warsaw and under the Congress Poland established by the Congress of Vienna, Stanisław Kostka Potocki (1755–1821). In some places, as at Krzemieniec and its Lyceum in southeastern Poland, this philosophy was to survive well into the nineteenth century. Although a belated philosophy from a western perspective, it was at the same time the philosophy of the future. This was the period between d'Alembert and Comte; and even as this variety of positivism was temporarily fading in the West, it was carrying on in Poland.

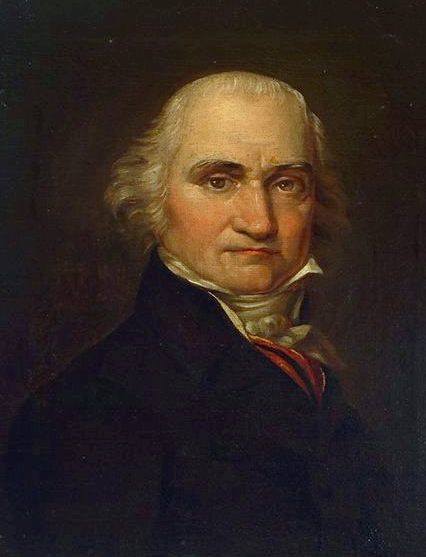
Jan Śniadecki

At the turn of the nineteenth century, as Immanuel Kant's fame was spreading over the rest of Europe, in Poland the Enlightenment philosophy was still in full flower. Kantism found here a hostile soil. Even before Kant had been understood, he was condemned by the most respected writers of the time: by Jan Śniadecki, Staszic, Kołłątaj, Tadeusz Czacki, later by Anioł Dowgird (1776–1835). Jan Śniadecki warned against this "fanatical, dark and apocalyptic mind," and wrote: "To revise Locke and Condillac, to desire a priori knowledge of things that human nature can grasp only by their consequences, is a lamentable aberration of mind."

Jan Śniadecki's younger brother, however, Jędrzej Śniadecki, was the first respected Polish scholar to declare (1799) for Kant. And in applying Kantian ideas to the natural sciences, he did something new that would not be undertaken until much later by Johannes Müller, Hermann Ludwig Ferdinand von Helmholtz and other famous scientists of the nineteenth century.

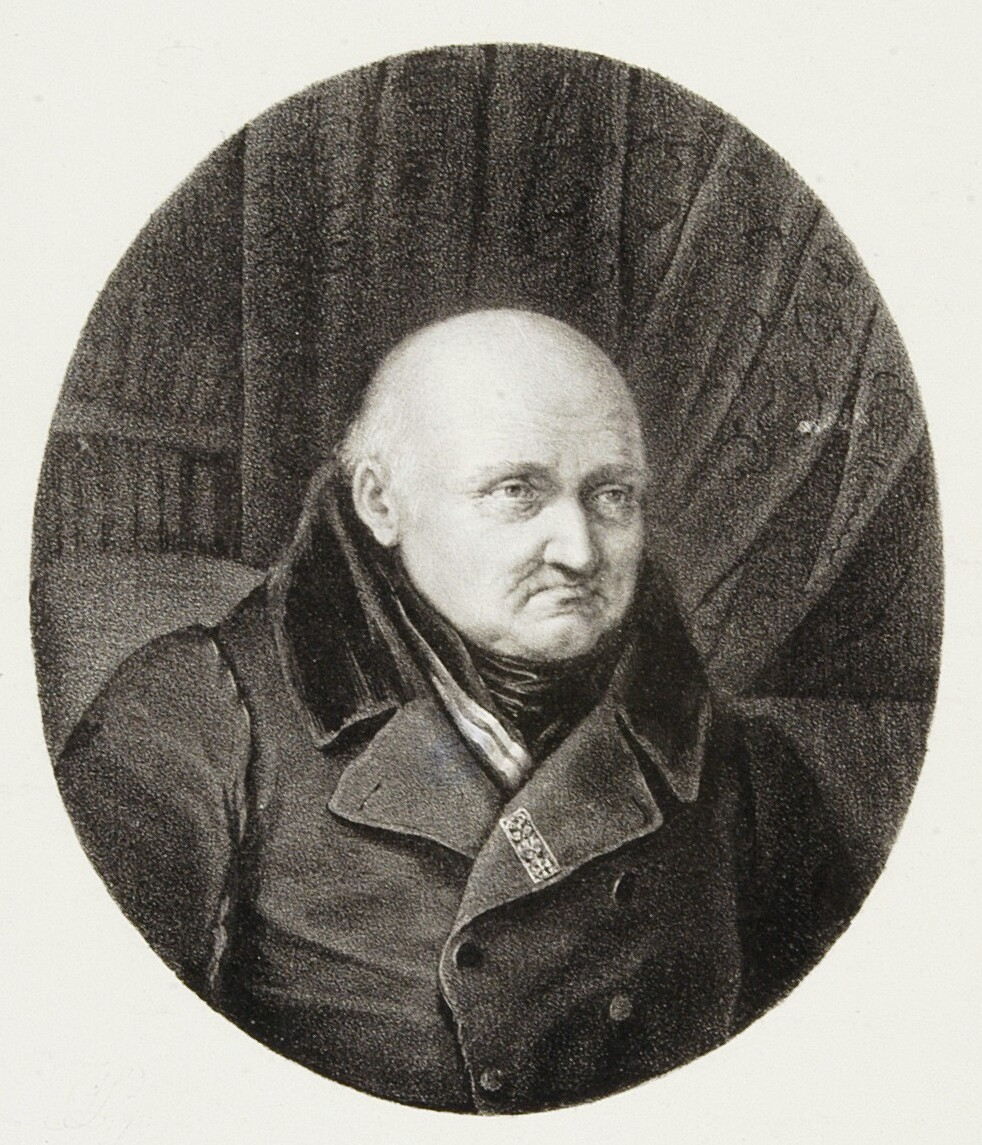
Józef Kalasanty Szaniawski

Another Polish proponent of Kantism was Józef Kalasanty Szaniawski (1764–1843), who had been a student of Kant's at Königsberg. But, having accepted the fundamental points of the critical theory of knowledge, he still hesitated between Kant's metaphysical agnosticism and the new metaphysics of Idealism. Thus this one man introduced to Poland both the antimetaphysical Kant and the post-Kantian metaphysics.

In time, Kant's foremost Polish sympathizer would be Feliks Jaroński (1777–1827), who lectured at Kraków in 1809–18. Still, his Kantian sympathies were only partial and this half-heartedness was typical of Polish Kantism generally. In Poland there was no actual Kantian period.

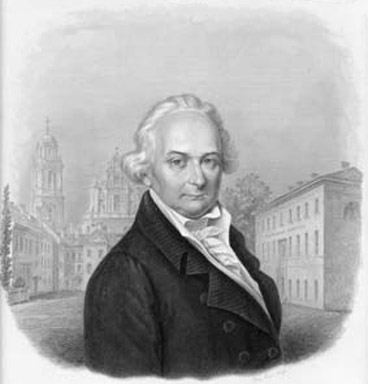
Jędrzej Śniadecki

For a generation, between the age of the French Enlightenment and that of the Polish national metaphysic, the Scottish philosophy of common sense became the dominant outlook in Poland. At the beginning of the nineteenth century, the Scottish School of Common Sense held sway in most European countries—in Britain till mid-century, and nearly as long in France. But in Poland, from the first, the Scottish philosophy fused with Kantism, in this regard anticipating the West.

The Kantian and Scottish ideas were united in typical fashion by Jędrzej Śniadecki (1768–1838). The younger brother of Jan Śniadecki, Jędrzej was an illustrious scientist, biologist and physician, and the more creative mind of the two. He had been educated at the universities of Kraków, Padua and Edinburgh and was from 1796 a professor at Wilno, where he held a chair of chemistry and pharmacy. He was a foe of metaphysics, holding that the fathoming of first causes of being was "impossible to fulfill and unnecessary." But foe of metaphysics that he was, he was not an Empiricist—and this was his link with Kant. "Experiment and observation can only gather... the materials from which common sense alone can build science."

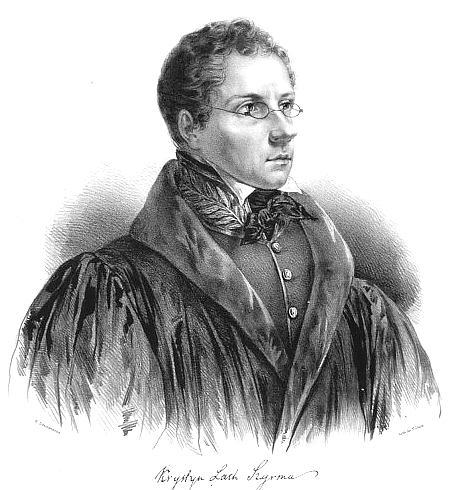
Lach-Szyrma

An analogous position, shunning both positivism and metaphysical speculation, affined to the Scots but linked in some features to Kantian critique, was held in the period before the November 1830 Uprising by virtually all the university professors in Poland: in Wilno, by Dowgird; in Kraków, by Józef Emanuel Jankowski (1790–1847); and in Warsaw, by Adam Ignacy Zabellewicz (1784–1831) and Krystyn Lach-Szyrma (1791–1866).

== Polish Messianism ==
In the early nineteenth century, following a generation imbued with Enlightenment ideas, Poland passed directly to a maximalist philosophical program, to absolute metaphysics, to syntheses, to great systems, to reform of the world through philosophy; and broke with Positivism, the doctrines of the Enlightenment, and the precepts of the Scottish School of Common Sense.

The Polish metaphysical blossoming occurred between the November 1830 and January 1863 Uprisings, and stemmed from the spiritual aspirations of a politically humiliated people.

The Poles' metaphysic, although drawing on German idealism, differed considerably from it; it was Spiritualist rather than Idealist. It was characterized by a theistic belief in a personal God, in the immortality of souls, and in the superiority of spiritual over corporeal forces.

The Polish metaphysic saw the mission of philosophy not only in the search for truth, but in the reformation of life and in the salvation of mankind. It was permeated with a faith in the metaphysical import of the nation and convinced that man could fulfill his vocation only within the communion of spirits that was the nation, that nations determined the evolution of mankind, and more particularly that the Polish nation had been assigned the role of Messiah to the nations.

These three traits—the founding of a metaphysic on the concept of the soul and on the concept of the nation, and the assignment to the latter of reformative-soteriological tasks—distinguished the Polish metaphysicians. Some, such as Hoene-Wroński, saw the Messiah in philosophy itself; others, such as the poet Mickiewicz, saw him in the Polish nation. Hence Hoene-Wroński, and later Mickiewicz, adopted for their doctrines the name, "Messianism". Messianism came to apply generically to Polish metaphysics of the nineteenth century, much as the term "Idealism" does to German metaphysics.

In the first half of the nineteenth century there appeared in Poland a host of metaphysicians unanimous as to these basic precepts, if strikingly at variance as to details. Their only center was Paris, which hosted Józef Maria Hoene-Wroński (1778–1853). Otherwise they lived in isolation: Bronisław Trentowski (1808–69) in Germany; Józef Gołuchowski (1797–1858) in Congress Poland; August Cieszkowski (1814–94) and Karol Libelt (1807–75) in Wielkopolska (western Poland); Józef Kremer (1806–75) in Kraków. Most of them became active only after the November 1830 Uprising.

An important role in the Messianist movement was also played by the Polish Romantic poets, Adam Mickiewicz (1798–1855), Juliusz Słowacki (1809–49) and Zygmunt Krasiński (1812–59), as well as by religious activists such as Andrzej Towiański (1799–1878).

Between the philosophers and the poets, the method of reasoning, and often the results, differed. The poets desired to create a specifically Polish philosophy, the philosophers—an absolute universal philosophy. The Messianist philosophers knew contemporary European philosophy and drew from it; the poets created more of a home-grown metaphysic.

The most important difference among the Messianists was that some were rationalists, others mystics. Wroński's philosophy was no less rationalist than Hegel's, while the poets voiced a mystical philosophy.

The Messianists were not the only Polish philosophers active in the period between the 1830 and 1863 uprisings. Much more widely known in Poland were Catholic thinkers such as Father Piotr Semenenko (1814–86), Florian Bochwic (1779–1856) and Eleonora Ziemięcka (1819–69), Poland's first woman philosopher. The Catholic philosophy of the period was more widespread and fervent than profound or creative. Also active were pure Hegelians such as Tytus Szczeniowski (1808–80) and leftist Hegelians such as Edward Dembowski (1822–46).

An outstanding representative of the philosophy of Common Sense, Michał Wiszniewski (1794–1865), had studied at that Enlightenment bastion, Krzemieniec; in 1820, in France, he had attended the lectures of Victor Cousin; and in 1821, in Britain, he had met the head of the Scottish School of Common Sense at the time, Dugald Stewart.

Active as well were precursors of Positivism such as Józef Supiński (1804–93) and Dominik Szulc (1797–1860)—links between the earlier Enlightenment age of the brothers Śniadecki and the coming age of Positivism.

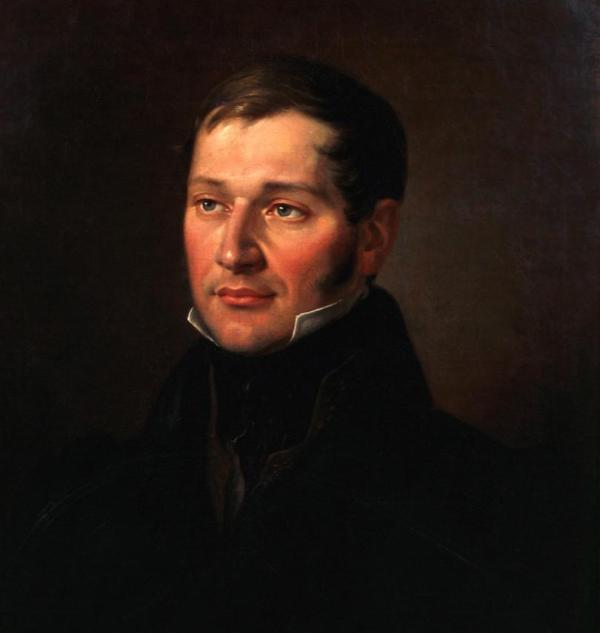
Andrzej Towiański

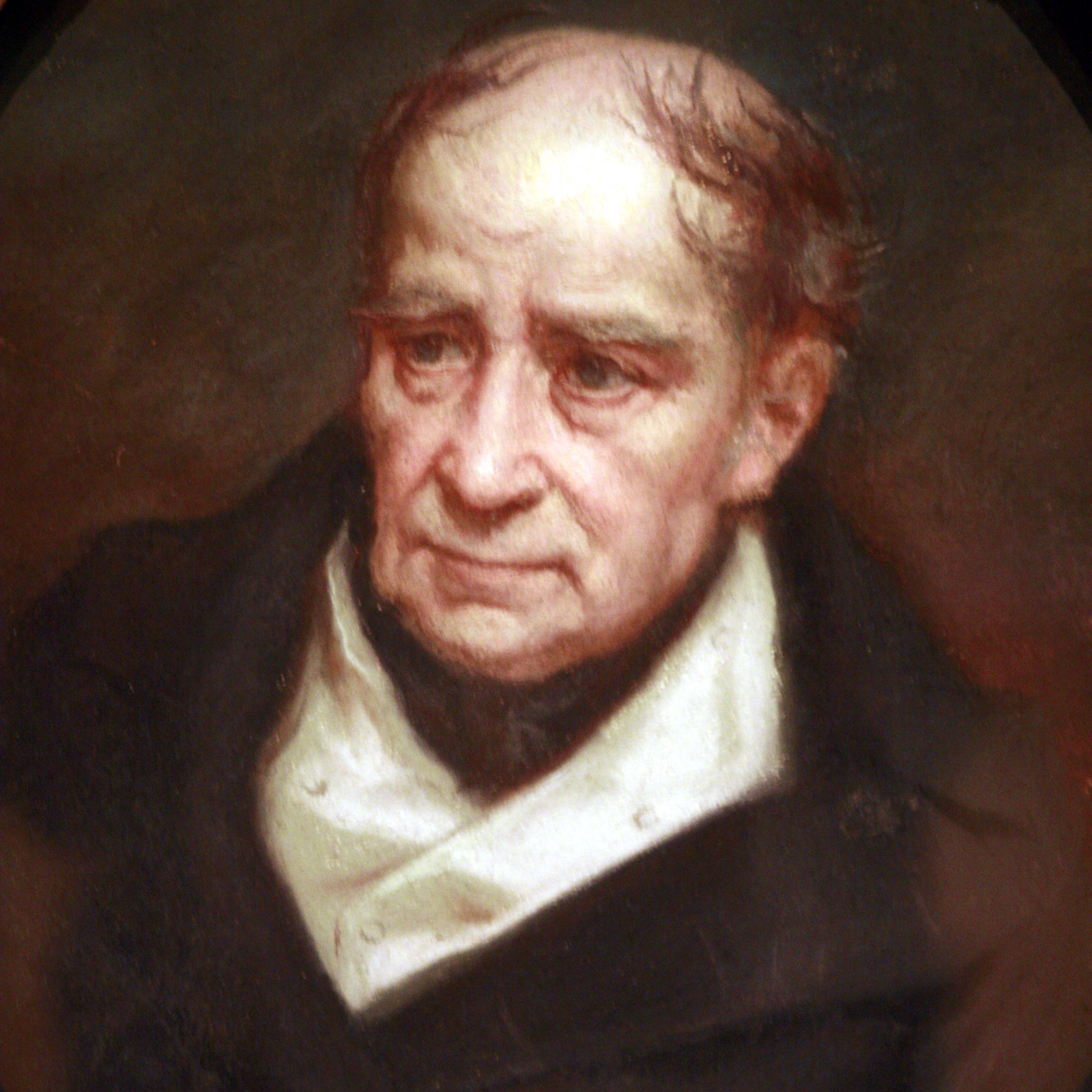
Józef Maria Hoene-Wroński

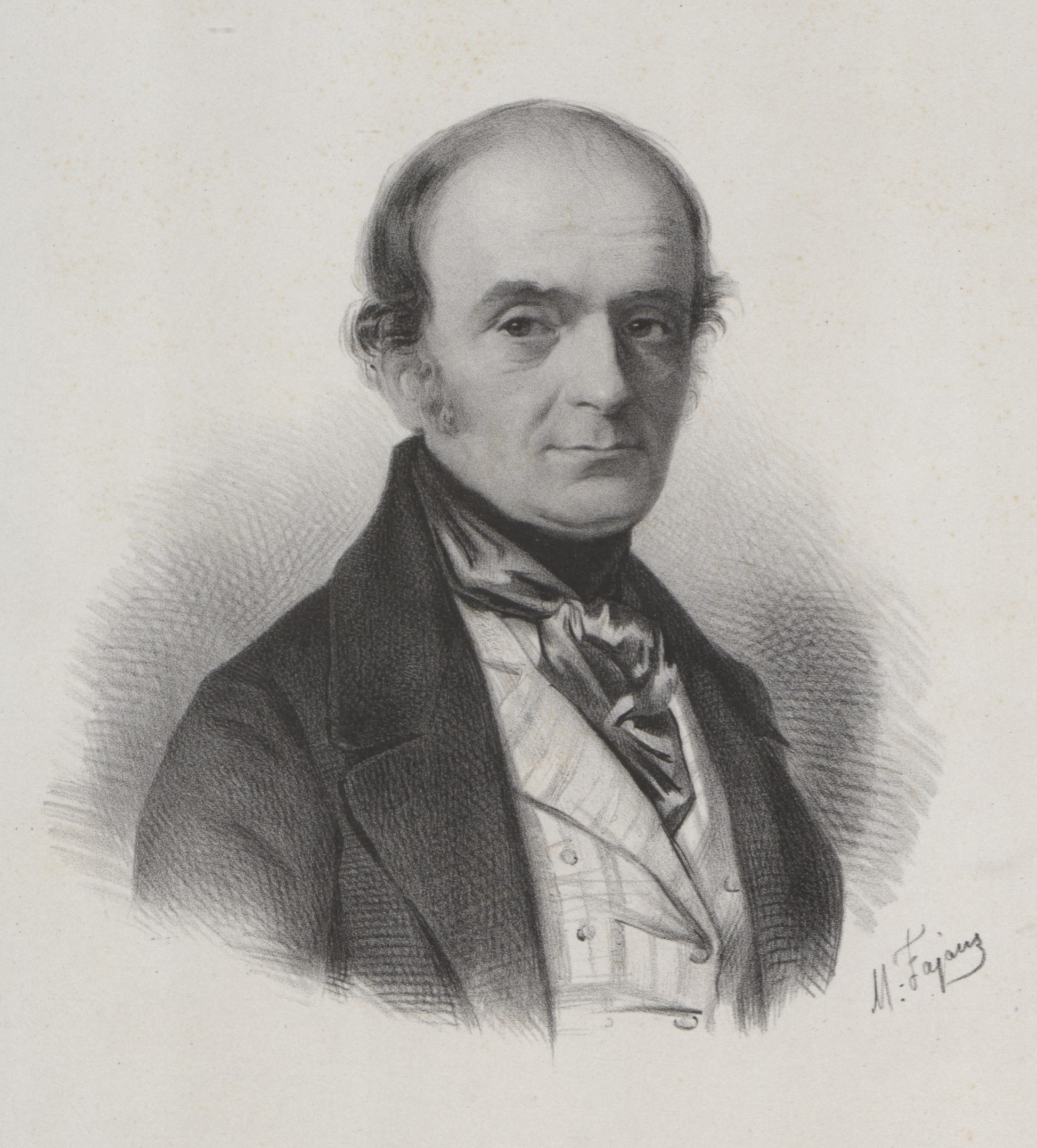
Józef Gołuchowski

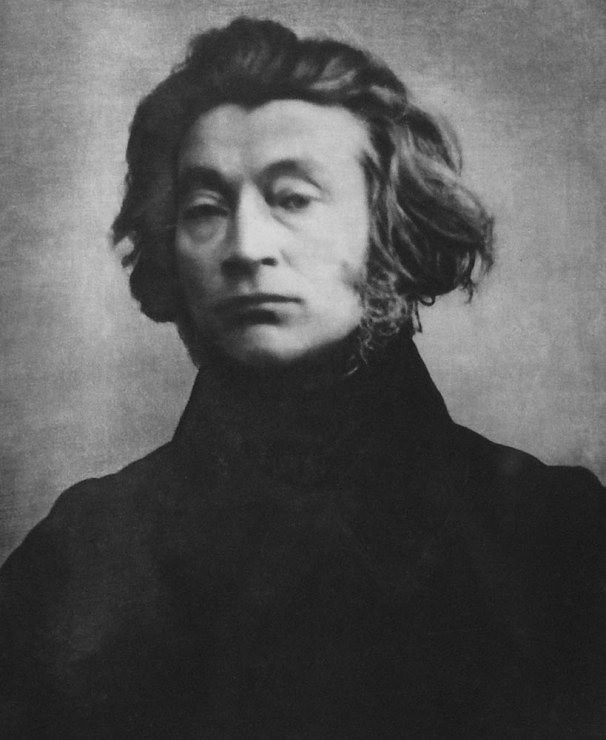
Adam Mickiewicz

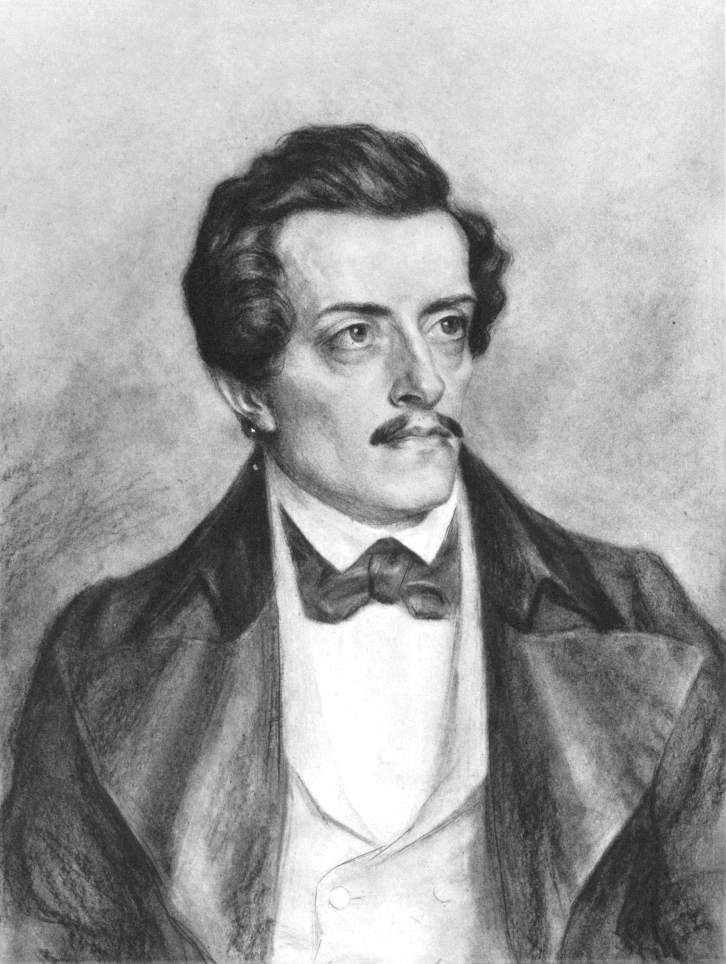
Juliusz Słowacki

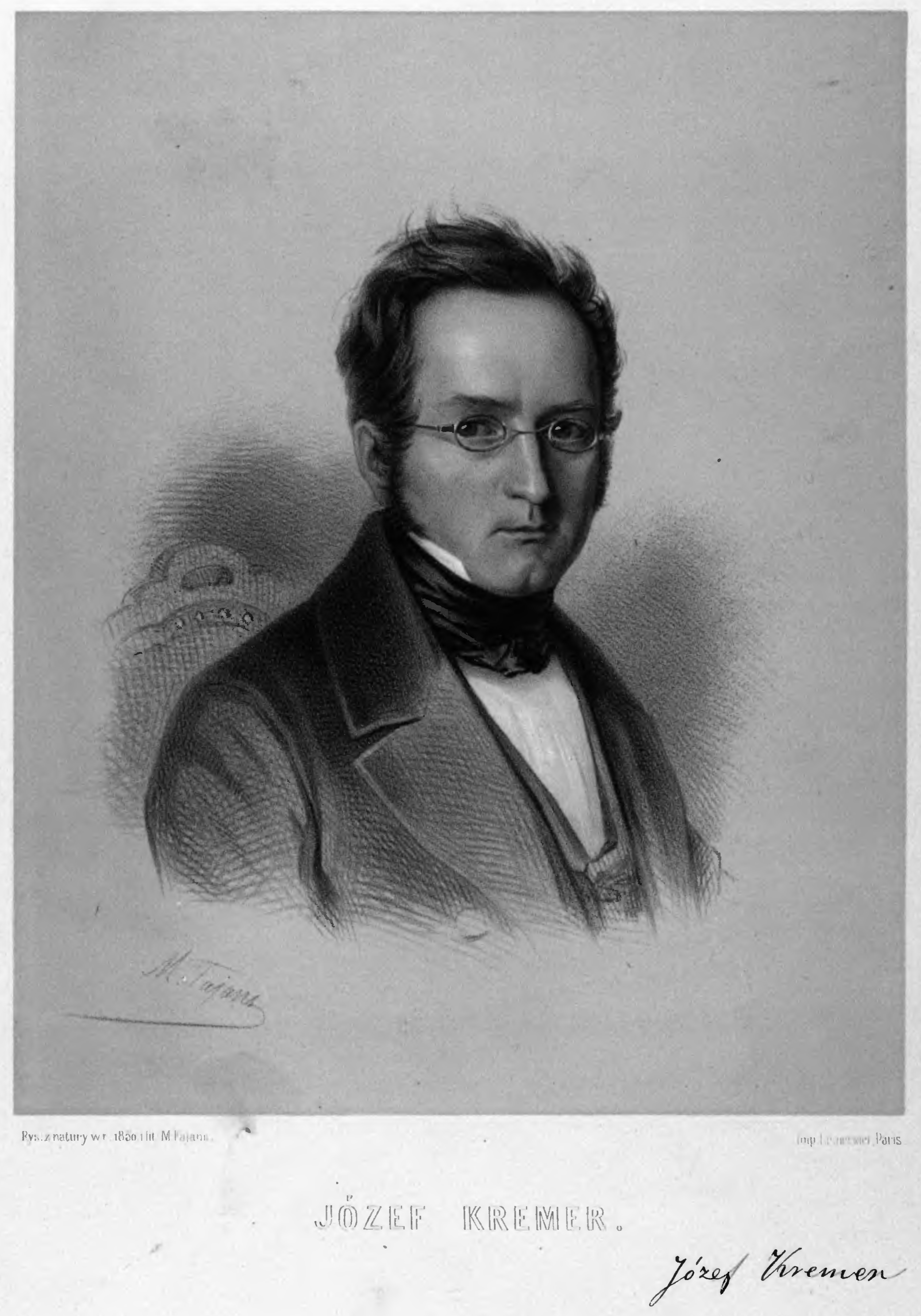
Józef Kremer

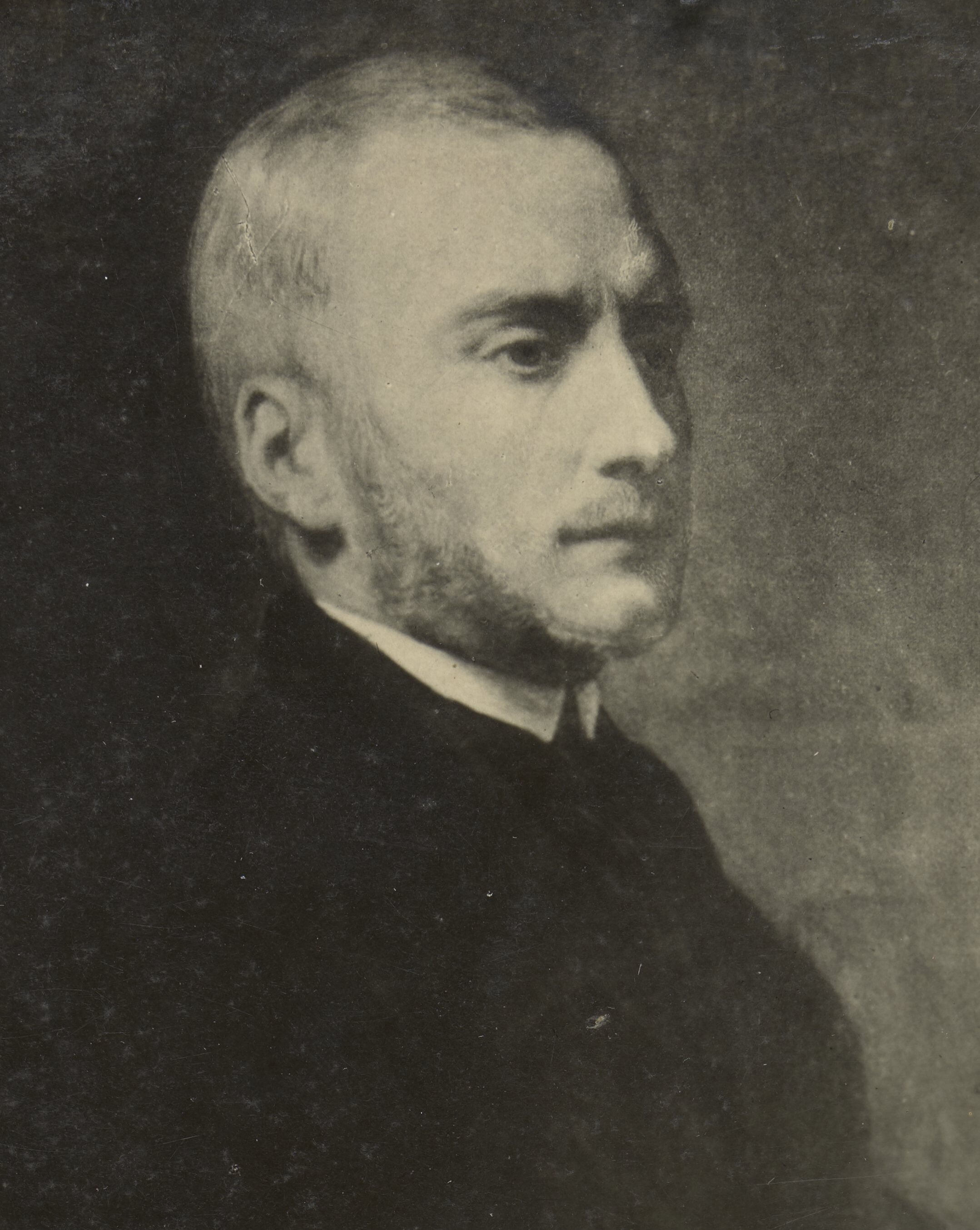
Zygmunt Krasiński

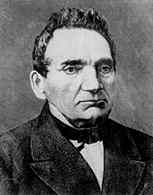
Karol Libelt

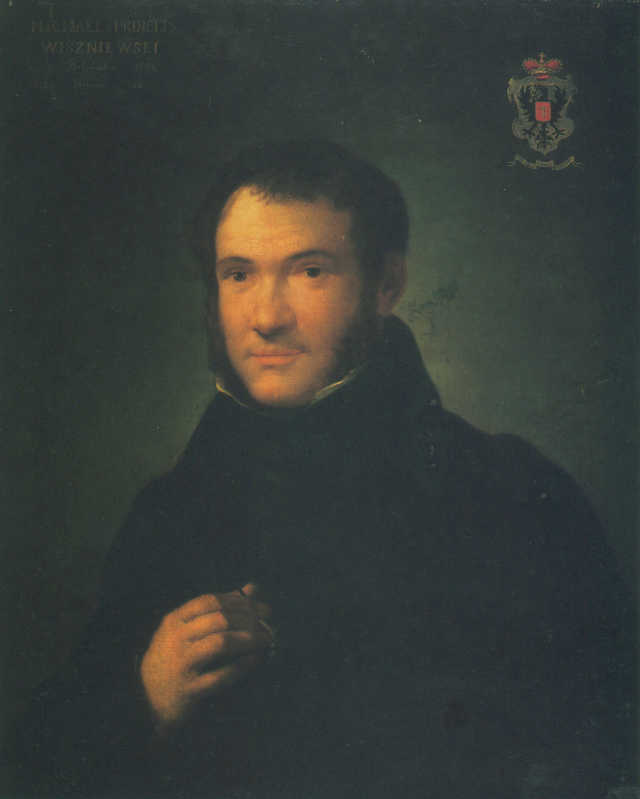
Michał Wiszniewski

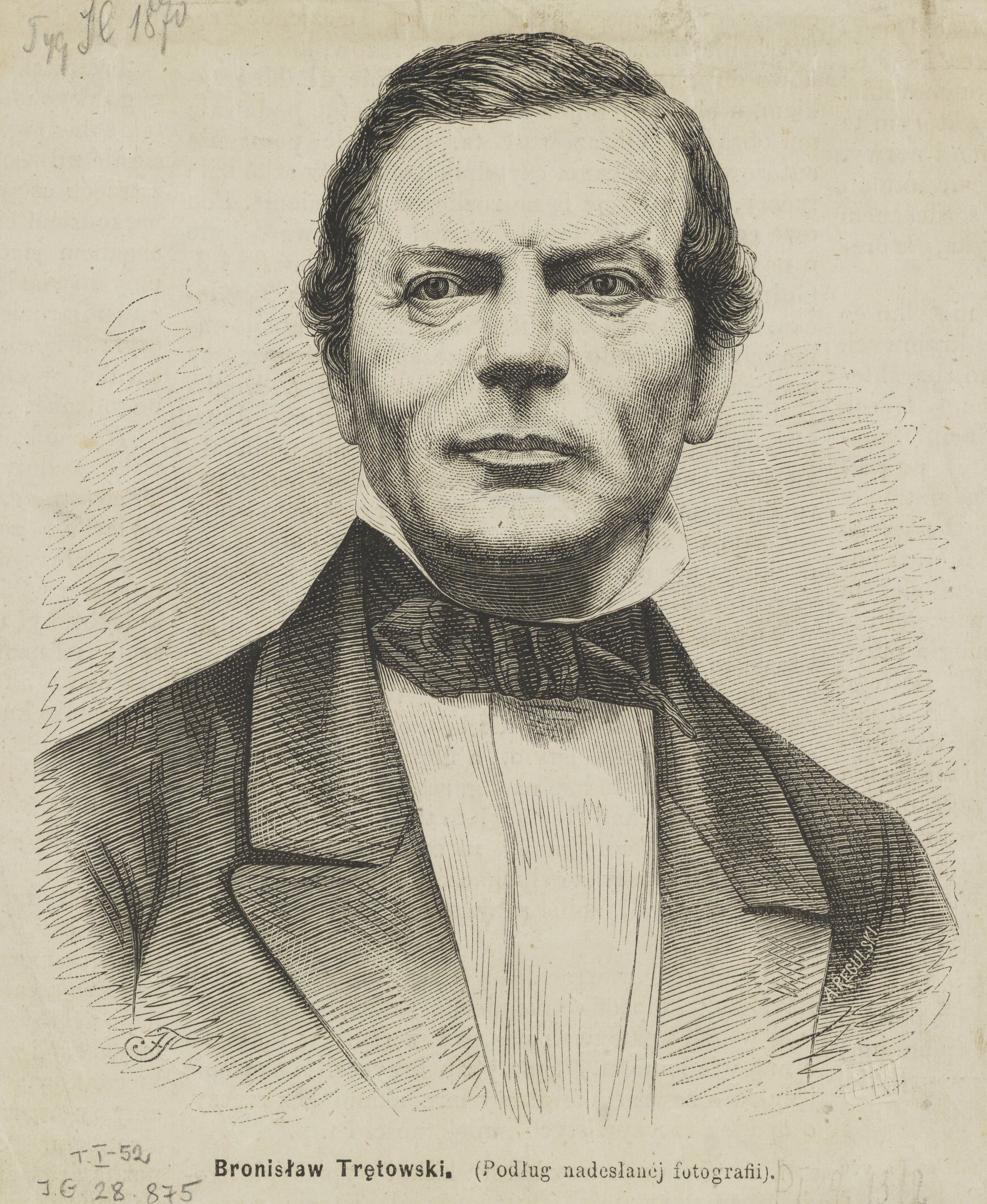
Bronisław Trentowski

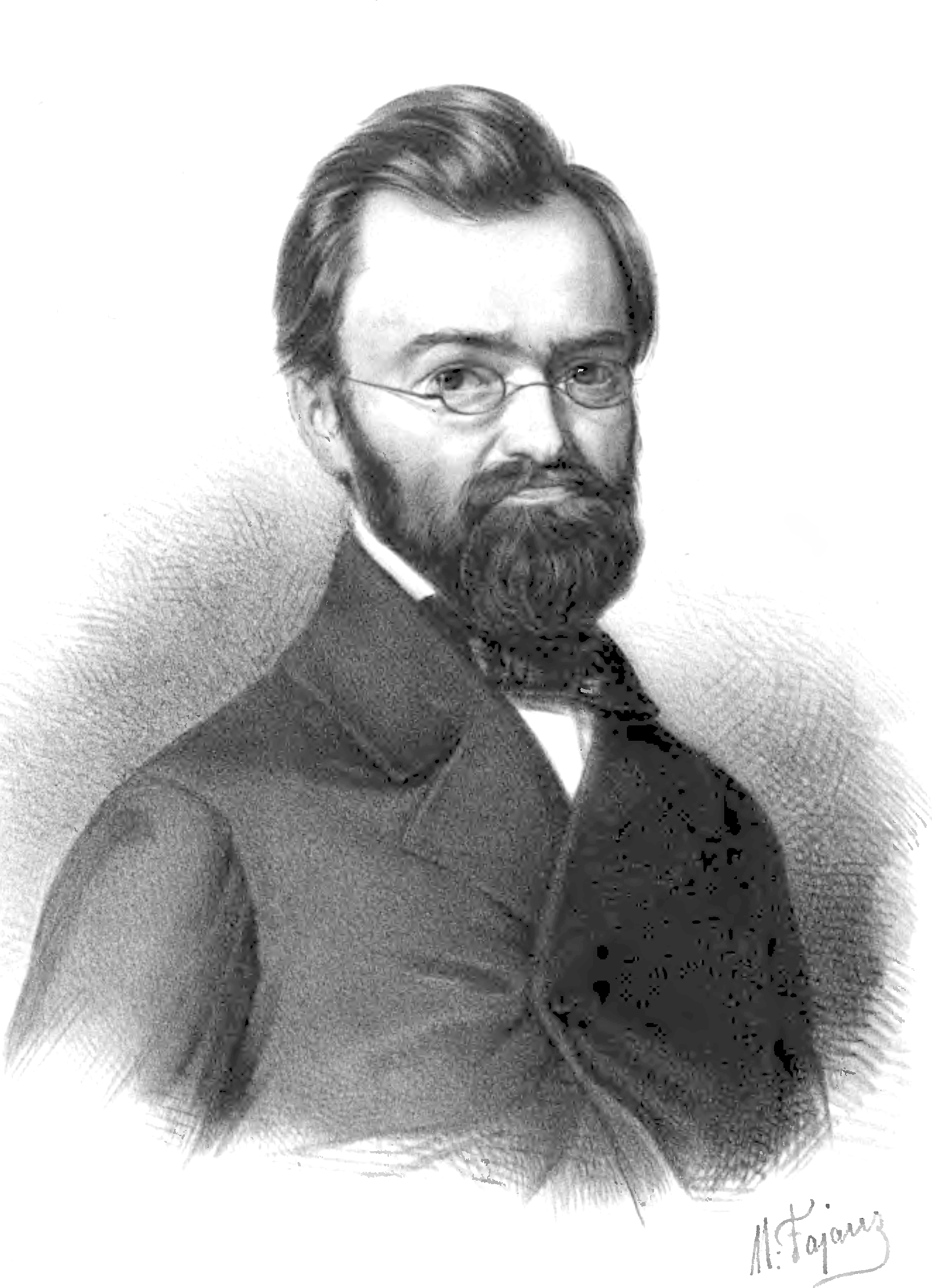
August Cieszkowski

== Positivism ==
The Positivist philosophy that took form in Poland after the January 1863 Uprising was hardly identical with the philosophy of Auguste Comte. It was in fact a return to the line of Jan Śniadecki and Hugo Kołłątaj—a line that had remained unbroken even during the Messianist period—now enriched with the ideas of Comte. However, it belonged only partly to philosophy. It combined Comte's ideas with those of John Stuart Mill and Herbert Spencer, for it was interested in what was common to them all: a sober, empirical attitude to life.

The Polish Positivism was a reaction against philosophical speculation, but also against romanticism in poetry and idealism in politics. It was less a scholarly movement than literary, political and social. Few original books were published, but many were translated from the philosophical literature of the West—not Comte himself, but easier writers: Hippolyte Taine, Mill, Spencer, Alexander Bain, Thomas Henry Huxley, the Germans Wilhelm Wundt and Friedrich Albert Lange, the Danish philosopher Höffding.

The disastrous outcome of the January 1863 Uprising had produced a distrust of romanticism, an aversion to ideals and illusions, and turned the search for redemption toward sober thought and work directed at realistic goals. The watchword became "organic work"—a term for the campaign for economic improvement, which was regarded as a prime requisite for progress. Poles prepared for such work by studying the natural sciences and economics: they absorbed Charles Darwin's biological theories, Mill's economic theories, Henry Thomas Buckle's deterministic theory of civilization. At length they became aware of the connection between their own convictions and aims and the Positivist philosophy of Auguste Comte, and borrowed its name and watchwords.

This movement, which had begun still earlier in Austrian-ruled Galicia, became concentrated with time in the Russian-ruled Congress Poland centered about Warsaw and is therefore commonly known as the "Warsaw Positivism." Its chief venue was the Warsaw Przegląd Tygodniowy (Weekly Review); Warsaw University (the "Main School") had been closed by the Russians in 1869.

The pioneers of the Warsaw Positivism were natural scientists and physicians rather than philosophers, and still more so journalists and men of letters: Aleksander Świętochowski (1849–1938), Piotr Chmielowski (1848–1904), Adolf Dygasiński (1839–1902), Bolesław Prus (1847–1912). Prus developed an original Utilitarian-inspired ethical system in his book, The Most General Life Ideals; his 1873 public lecture On Discoveries and Inventions, subsequently printed as a pamphlet, is a remarkably prescient contribution to what would, in the following century, become the field of logology ("the science of science").

The movement's leader was Prus' friend, Julian Ochorowicz (1850–1917), a trained philosopher with a doctorate from the University of Leipzig. In 1872 he wrote: "We shall call a Positivist, anyone who bases assertions on verifiable evidence; who does not express himself categorically about doubtful things, and does not speak at all about those that are inaccessible."

The Warsaw Positivists—who included faithful Catholics such as Father Franciszek Krupiński (1836–98)—formed a common front against Messianism together with the Neo-Kantians. The Polish Kantians were rather loosely associated with Kant and belonged to the Positivist movement. They included Władysław Mieczysław Kozłowski (1858–1935), Piotr Chmielowski (1848–1904) and Marian Massonius (1862–1945).

The most brilliant philosophical mind in this period was Adam Mahrburg (1855–1913). He was a Positivist in his understanding of philosophy as a discipline and in his uncompromising ferreting out of speculation, and a Kantian in his interpretation of mind and in his centering of philosophy upon the theory of knowledge.

In Kraków, Father Stefan Pawlicki (1839–1916), professor of philosophy at the University of Kraków, was a man of broad culture and philosophical bent, but lacked talent for writing or teaching. Under his thirty-plus-year tenure, Kraków philosophy became mainly a historical discipline, alien to what was happening in the West and in Warsaw.

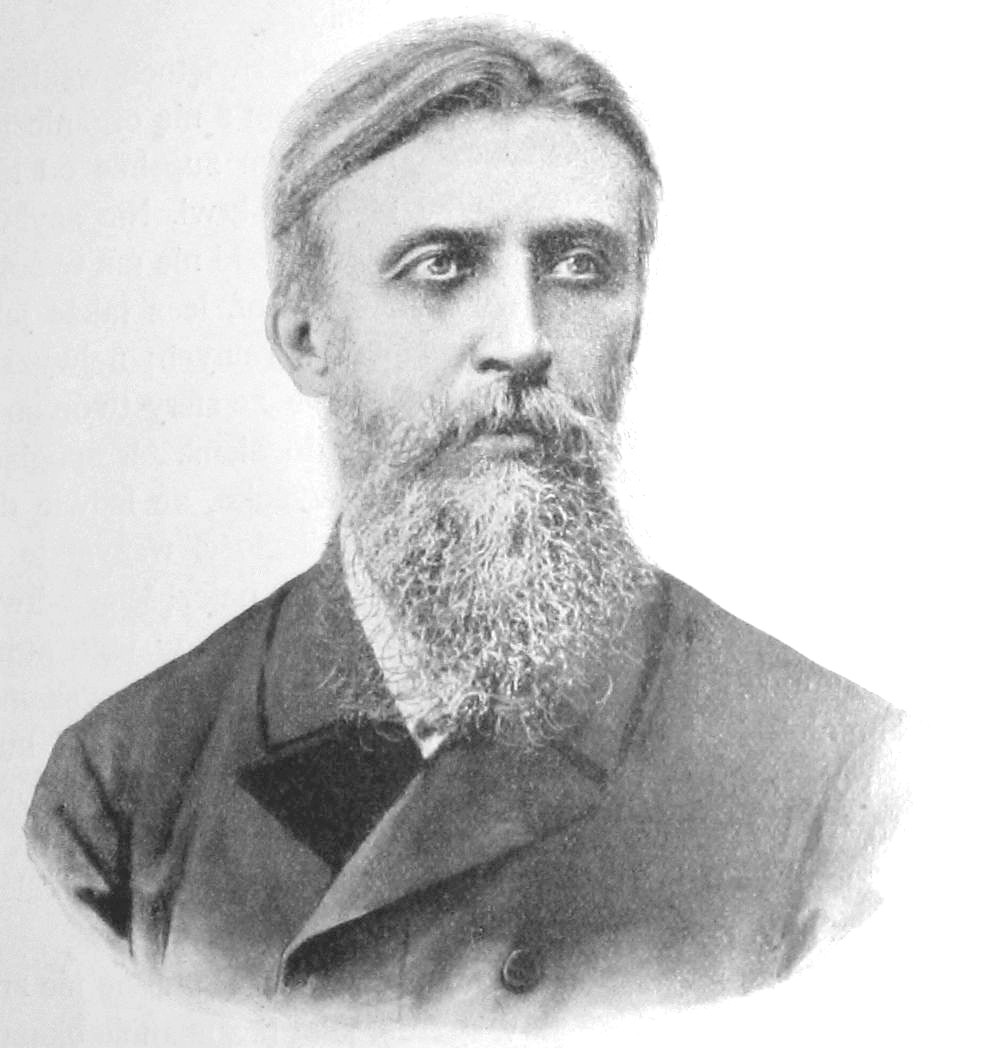
Aleksander Świętochowski

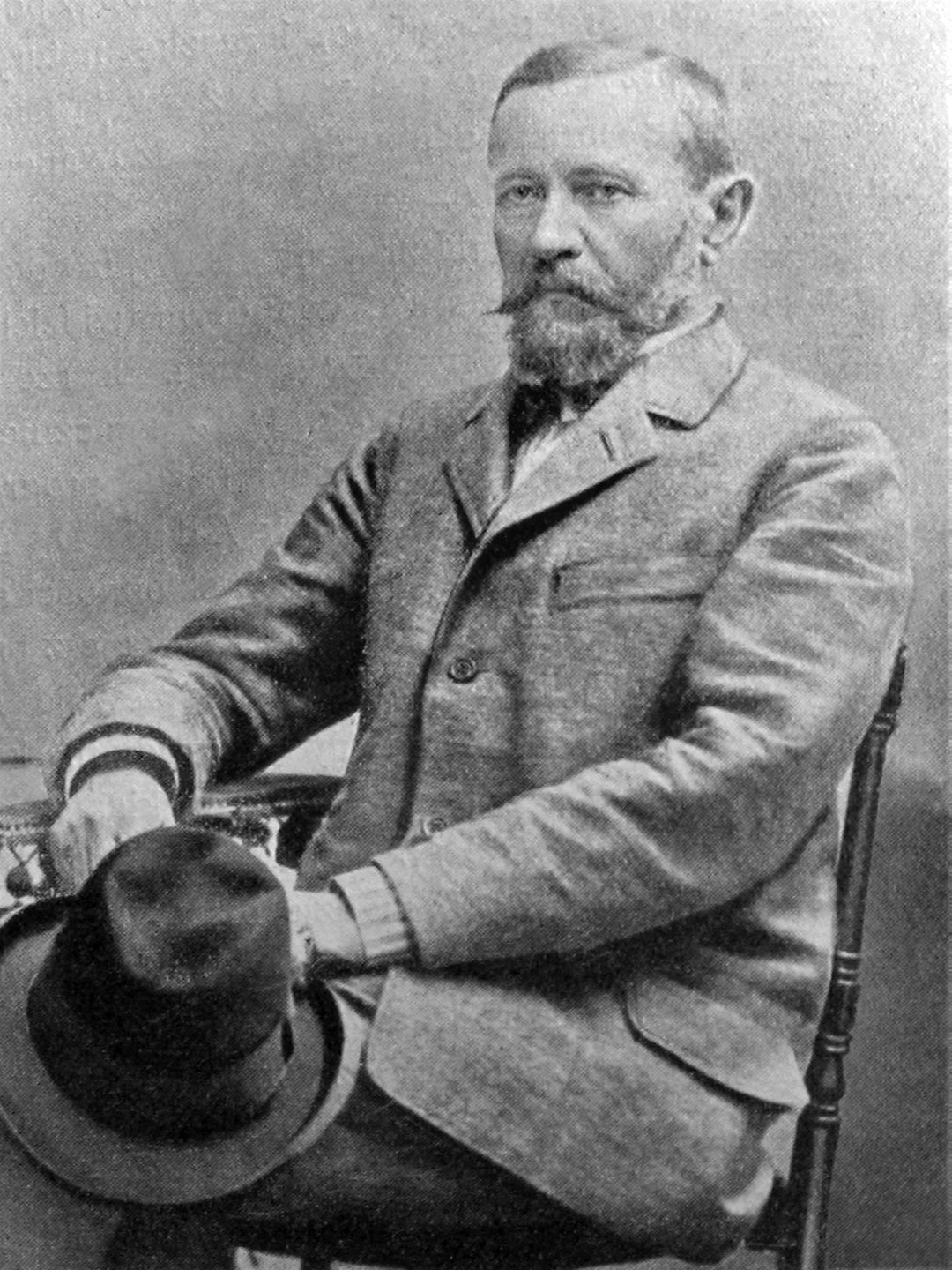
Adolf Dygasiński

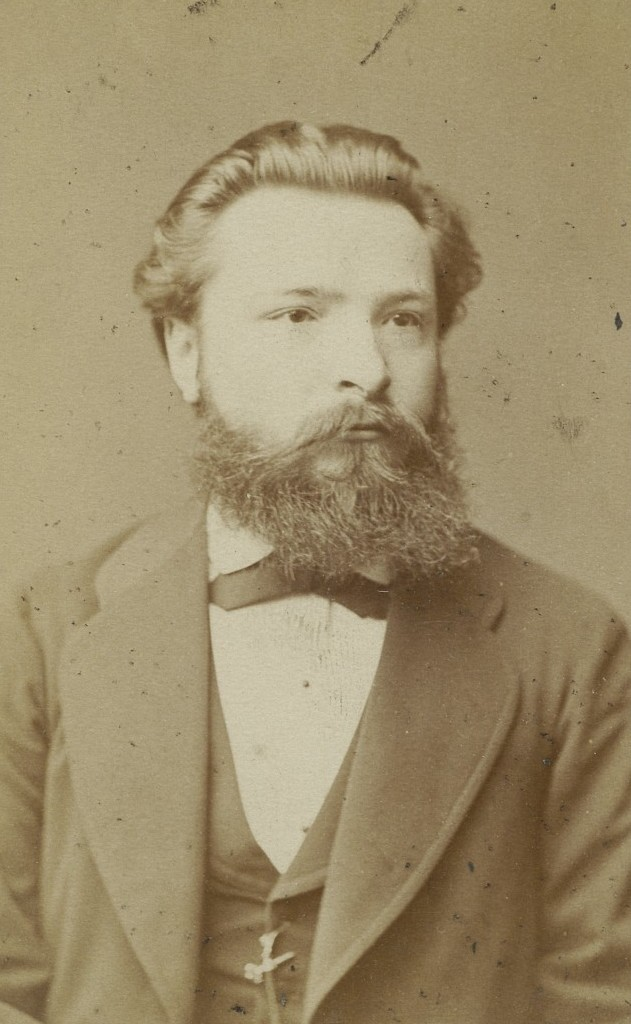
Julian Ochorowicz

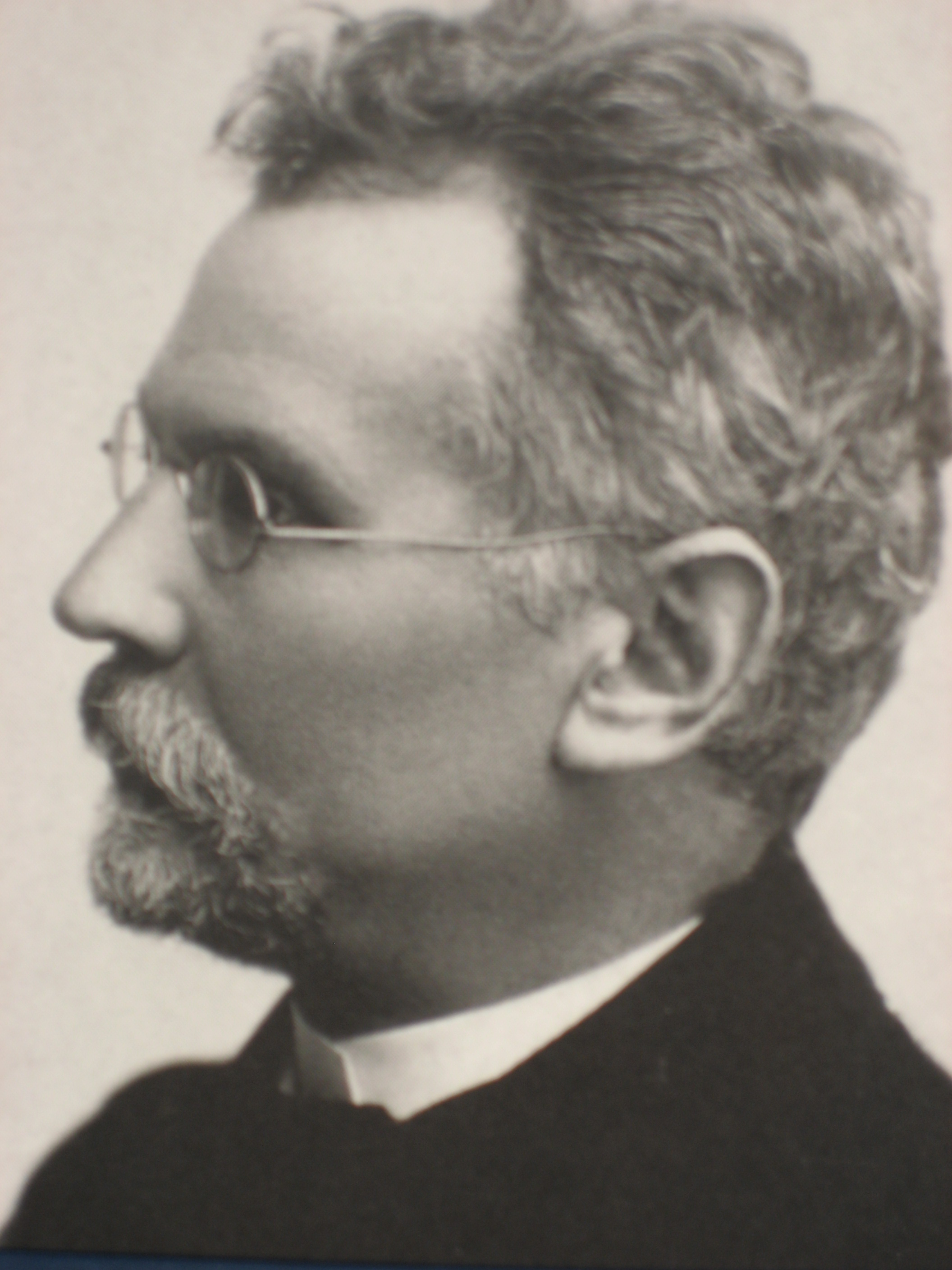
Bolesław Prus

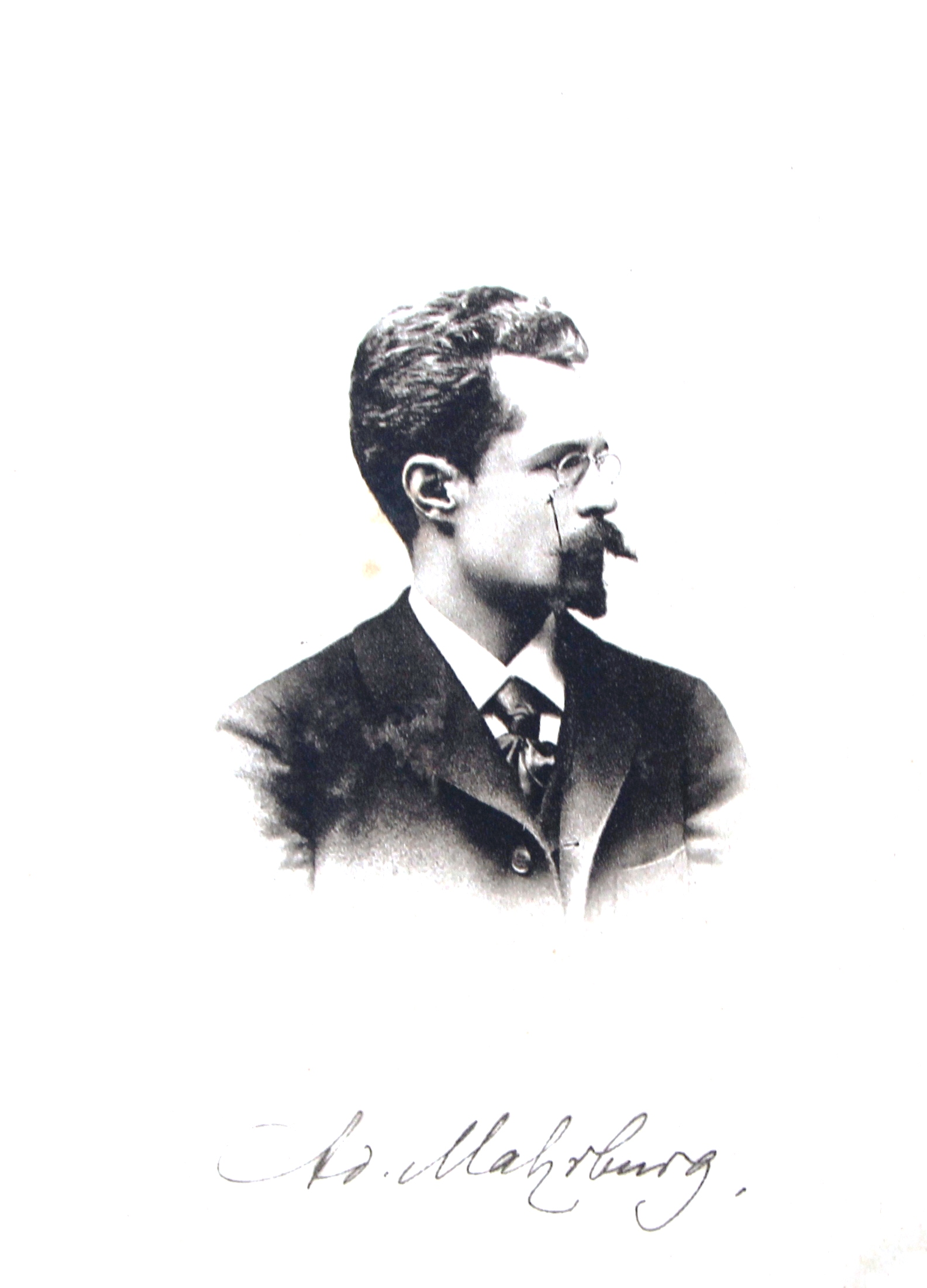
Adam Mahrburg

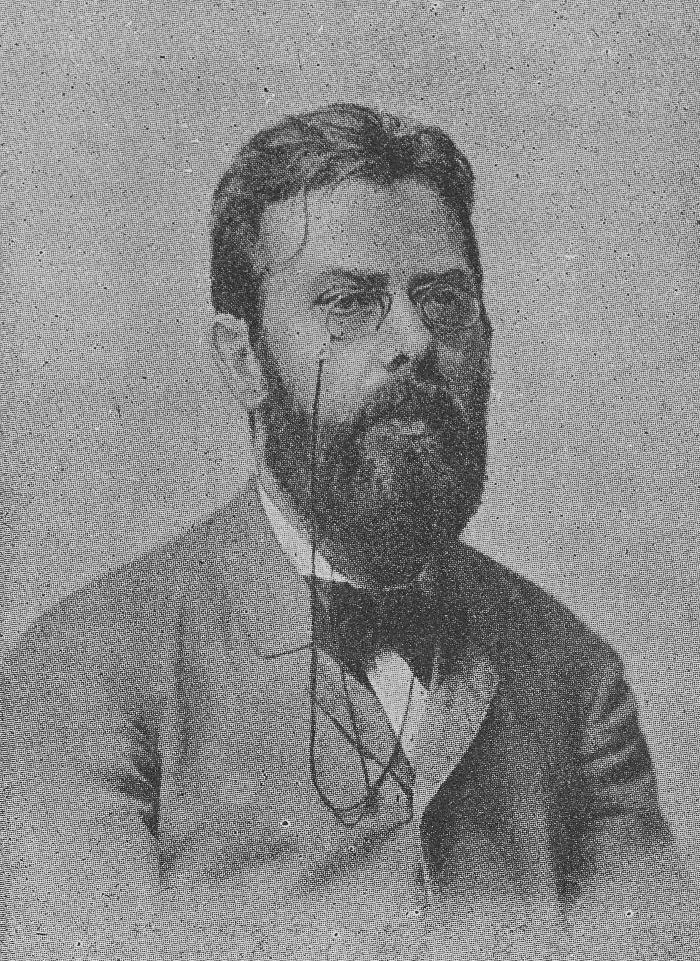
Piotr Chmielowski

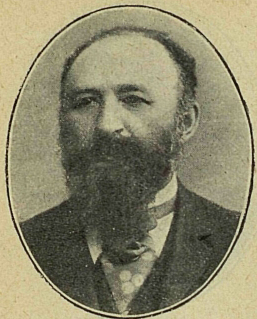
Marian Massonius

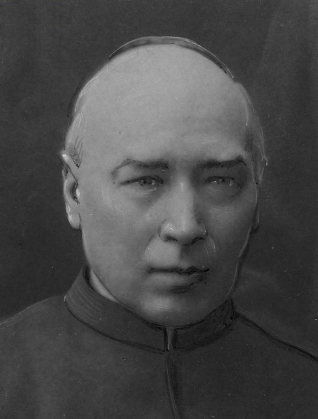
Stefan Pawlicki

== 20th century ==
Even before Poland regained independence at the end of World War I, its intellectual life continued to develop. This was the case particularly in Russian-ruled Warsaw, where in lieu of underground lectures and secret scholarly organizations a Wolna Wszechnica Polska (Free Polish University) was created in 1905 and the tireless Władysław Weryho (1868–1916) had in 1898 founded Poland's first philosophical journal, Przegląd Filozoficzny (The Philosophical Review), and in 1904 a Philosophical Society.

In 1907 Weryho founded a Psychological Society, and subsequently Psychological and Philosophical Institutes. About 1910 the small number of professionally trained philosophers increased sharply, as individuals returned who had been inspired by Mahrburg's underground lectures to study philosophy in Austrian-ruled Lwów and Kraków or abroad.

Kraków as well, especially after 1910, saw a quickening of the philosophical movement, particularly at the Polish Academy of Learning, where at the prompting of Władysław Heinrich there came into being in 1911 a Committee for the History of Polish Philosophy and there was an immense growth in the number of philosophical papers and publications, no longer only of a historical character.

At Lwów, Kazimierz Twardowski (1866–1938) from 1895 stimulated a lively philosophical movement, in 1904 founded the Polish Philosophical Society, and in 1911 began publication of Ruch Filozoficzny (The Philosophical Movement).

There was growing interest in western philosophical currents, and much discussion of Pragmatism and Bergsonism, psychoanalysis, Henri Poincaré's Conventionalism, Edmund Husserl's Phenomenology, the Marburg School, and the social-science methodologies of Wilhelm Dilthey and Heinrich Rickert. At the same time, original ideas developed on Polish soil.

Those who distinguished themselves in Polish philosophy in these pre-World War I years of the twentieth century, formed two groups.

One group developed apart from institutions of higher learning and learned societies, and appealed less to trained philosophers than to broader circles, which it (if but briefly) captured. It constituted a reaction against the preceding period of Positivism, and included Stanisław Brzozowski (1878–1911), Wincenty Lutosławski (1863–1954) and, to a degree, Edward Abramowski (1868–1918).

The second group of philosophers who started off Polish philosophy in the twentieth century had an academic character. They included Władysław Heinrich (1869–1957) in Kraków, Kazimierz Twardowski (1866–1938) in Lwów, and Leon Petrażycki (1867–1931) abroad—all three, active members of the Polish Academy of Learning. Despite the considerable differences among them, they shared some basic features: all three were empiricists concerned not with metaphysics but with the foundations of philosophy; they were interested in philosophy itself, not merely its history; they understood philosophy in positive terms, but none of them was a Positivist in the old style.

Following the restoration of Poland's independence in 1918, the two older universities (Kraków University, Lwów University) were joined by four new ones (Warsaw University, Poznań University, Wilno University, Lublin University). New philosophical journals appeared; all the university cities formed philosophical associations; conventions of Polish philosophers were held; philosophy became more professional, academic, scholarly.

A characteristic of the interbellum was that maximalist, metaphysical currents began to fade away. The dominant ambition in philosophical theory now was not breadth but precision. This was a period of specialization, consistent with the conviction that general philosophy would not yield precise results such as could be obtained in logic, psychology or the history of philosophy.

A few individuals did develop a general philosophical outlook: notably, Tadeusz Kotarbiński (1886–1981), Stanisław Ignacy Witkiewicz (1885–1939), and Roman Ingarden (1893–1970).

Otherwise, however, specialization was the rule. The Kraków school, true to tradition, showed an eminently historical character and produced a medievalist of world renown, Father Konstanty Michalski (1879–1947). The Lwów school concentrated on the analysis of concepts; and in doing so, it considered both their aspects, the subjective and objective—hence, the psychological and the logical. Twardowski himself continued working at the border of psychology and logic; his pupils, however, generally split in their interests, specializing in either psychology or logic.

The analytical program that Twardowski passed on to his pupils, and which they in turn spread throughout Poland, was affined to that of Franz Brentano's school (Twardowski's alma mater) in Austria and to that of the British analytic school, which likewise had arisen as a reaction against speculative systems.

The alumni of the Lwów school entered three distinct fields. Some devoted themselves to psychology: Stefan Błachowski (1889–1962), professor at Poznań, entirely; Władysław Witwicki (1878–1948), professor at Warsaw, partly. Others pursued the theory of knowledge: they included Kazimierz Ajdukiewicz (1890–1963), professor at Lwów, and after World War II at Poznań, whose views resembled Neopositivism and who developed an original theory of radical Conventionalism. The third group worked in mathematical, or symbolic, logic.

The most important center for mathematical logic was Warsaw. The Warsaw school of logic was headed by Jan Łukasiewicz (1878–1956) and Stanisław Leśniewski (1886–1939), professors at Warsaw University. The first of their pupils to achieve eminence, even before World War II, was Alfred Tarski (1902–83), from 1939 in the United States, where he became a professor at the University of California, Berkeley. Another pupil of Łukasiewicz, Bolesław Sobociński (28 June 1906 – 31 October 1980), became a professor of philosophy at the University of Notre Dame. The Warsaw logic gained a worldwide importance similar to that of the Kraków medievalism.

Warsaw was not, however, the sole Polish venue for logic studies. They were initiated at Kraków by Jan Śleszyński (aka Ivan Śleszyński, aka Ivan Vladislavovich Sleshinsky, 1854–1931), professor of mathematics and logic. At Kraków also, and later at Lwów, logic studies were conducted by Leon Chwistek (1884–1944), a multi-faceted and somewhat eccentric thinker—mathematician, philosopher, esthetician, painter—whose name came to be associated popularly with his concept of "plural realities."

After Petrażycki's death, the outstanding legal philosopher was Czesław Znamierowski (1888–1967), professor of philosophy at Poznań. Another leading thinker of the period, active on the borderlines of sociology and philosophy, in both Poland and the United States, was Florian Znaniecki (1882–1958).

In the interbellum, the philosopher members of the Polish Academy of Learning included Władysław Heinrich (1869–1957; Kraków), Kazimierz Twardowski (1866–1938; Lwów), Leon Petrażycki (1867–1931; Warsaw), and, from the following generation: Konstanty Michalski (1879–1947), Jan Łukasiewicz (1878–1956), and Władysław Tatarkiewicz (1886–1980). Michalski's historical works revolutionized prevailing views on via moderna in late medieval philosophy. Łukasiewicz gained world fame with his concept of many-valued logic and is known for his "Polish notation." Tatarkiewicz was the first to prepare in Polish a large-scale comprehensive history of western philosophy and a History of Aesthetics and worked at systematizing the concepts of aesthetics and ethics.

After World War II, Roman Ingarden (1893–1970), Tadeusz Kotarbiński (1886–1981), and Alfred Tarski became members of the Polish Academy of Sciences.

For some four decades following World War II, in Poland, a disproportionately prominent official role was given to Marxist philosophy. This, and contemporaneous sociopolitical currents, stimulated Leszek Kołakowski (1927–2009), writing in exile, to publish influential critiques of Marxist theory and communist practice. Kołakowski also wrote a remarkable history of Positivist Philosophy from Hume to the Vienna Circle.

Similarly notable for his critiques of Soviet Marxism was Józef Maria Bocheński (1902–95), O.P., a Catholic philosopher of the Dominican Order who lectured in Rome at the Pontifical University of Saint Thomas Aquinas (the Angelicum) and at the University of Fribourg in Switzerland. Bocheński also gained renown for his work in logic and ethics.

Other Polish philosophers of the postwar period included Andrzej Zabłudowski (1938–2008), a logician and analytic philosopher of world influence, especially in the theory of induction, working at Warsaw University except for a three-decade hiatus beginning in 1968; Marek Siemek (1942–2011), a historian of German transcendental philosophy and recipient of an honorary doctorate from Bonn University; and Jan Woleński (born 1940), a broadly erudite thinker at the Jagiellonian University in Kraków, specializing in the history of the Lwów-Warsaw school and in analytic philosophy.

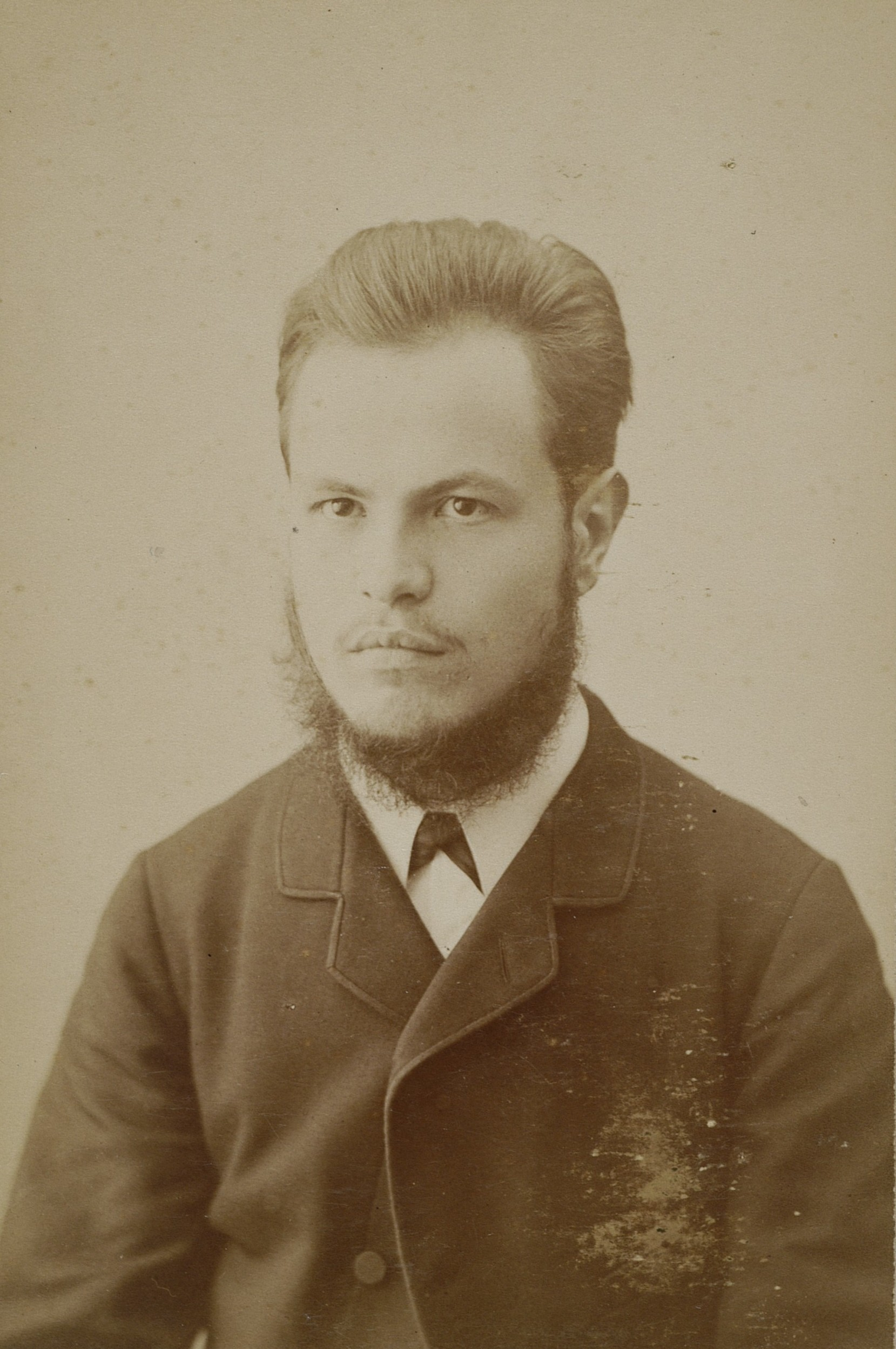
Wincenty Lutosławski

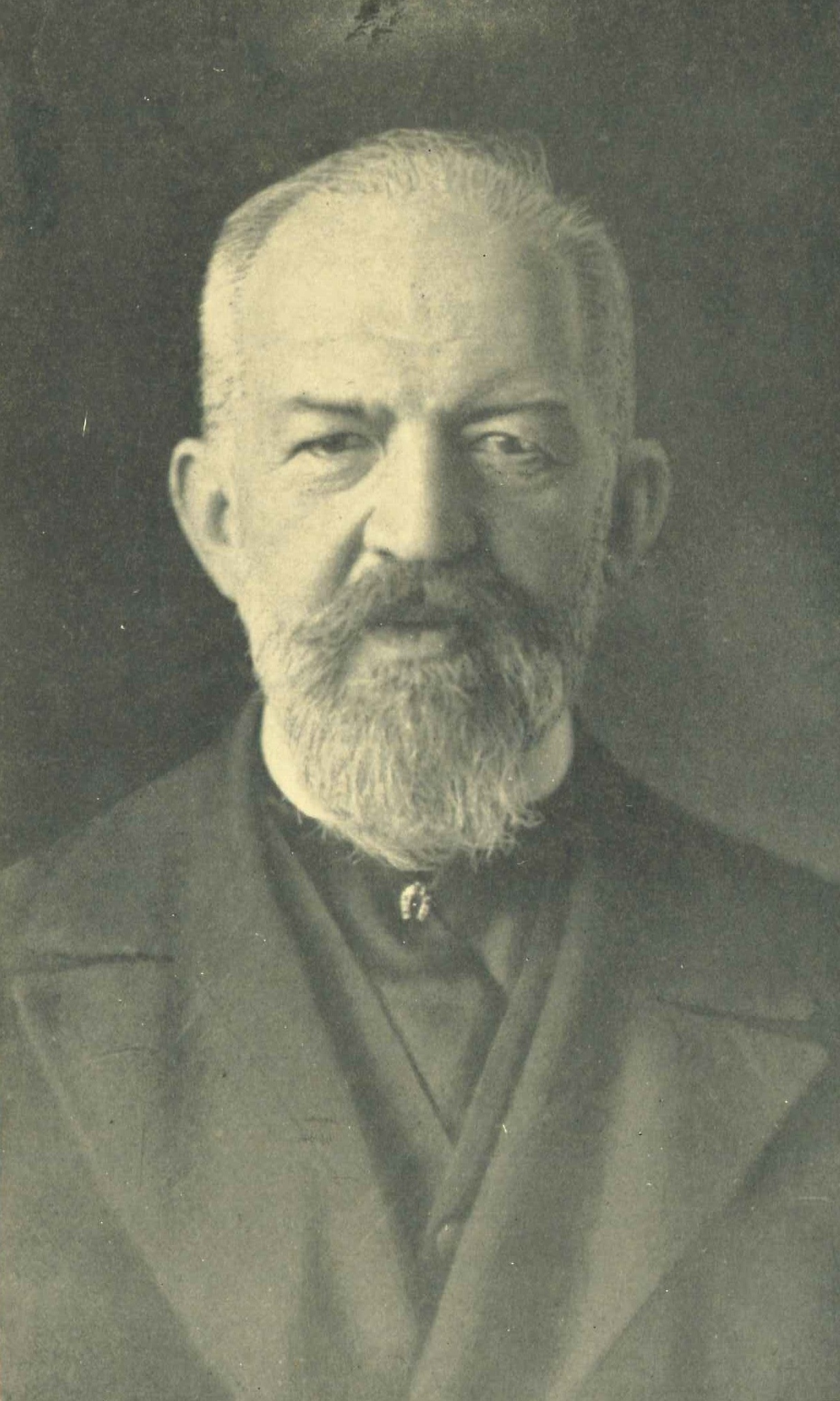
Kazimierz Twardowski

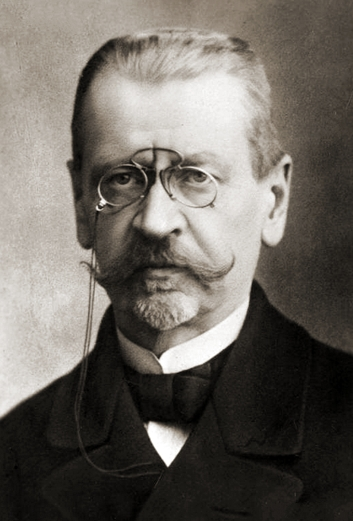
Leon Petrażycki

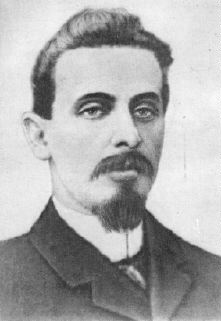
Stanisław Brzozowski

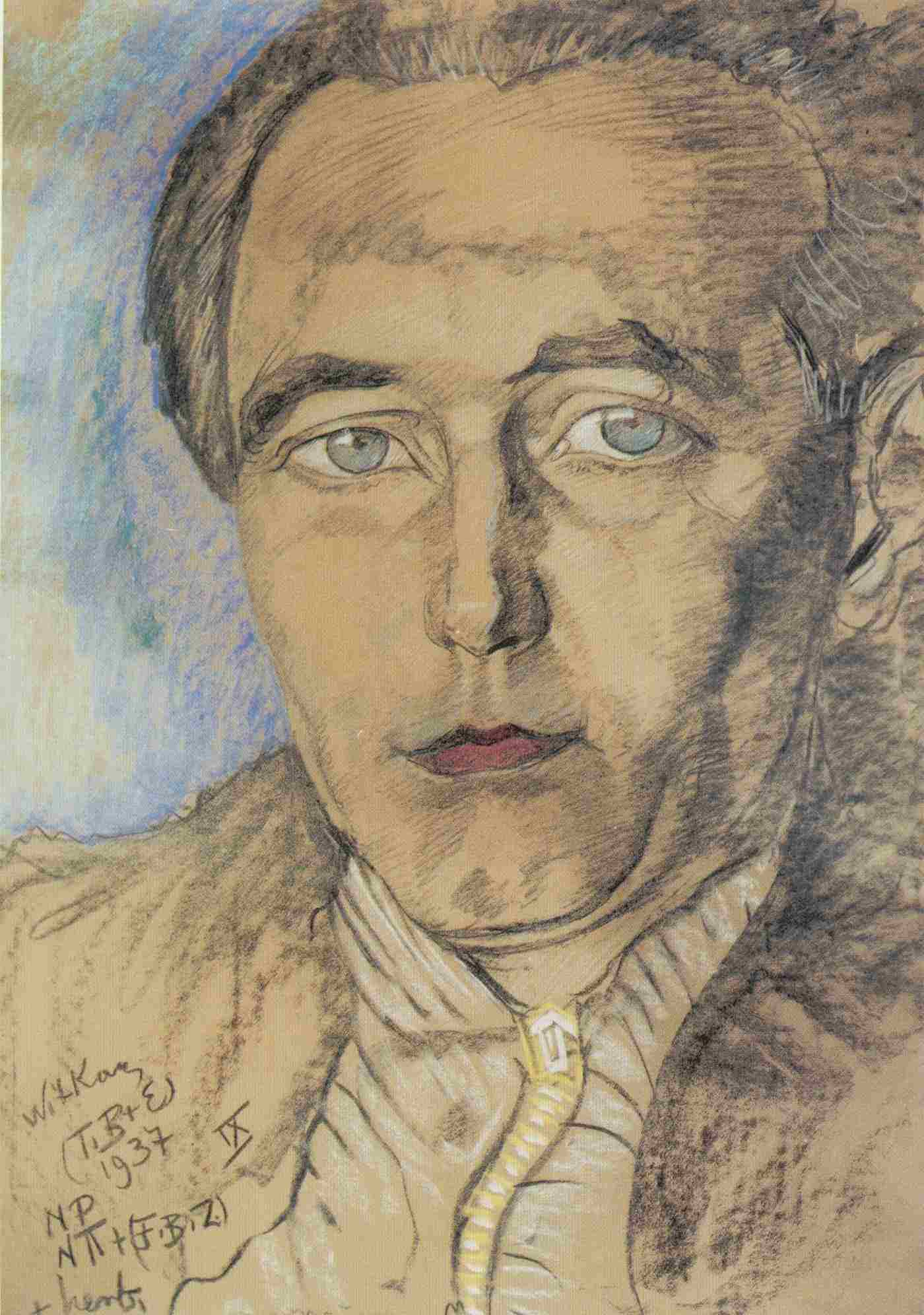
Roman Ingarden

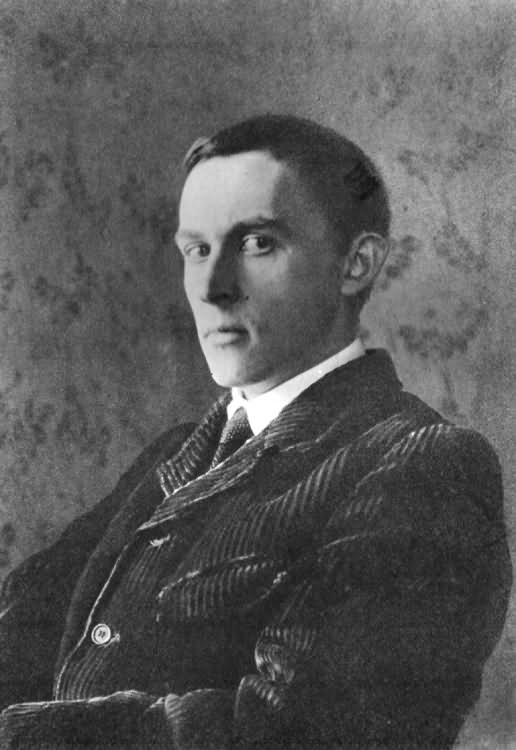
Stanisław Ignacy Witkiewicz

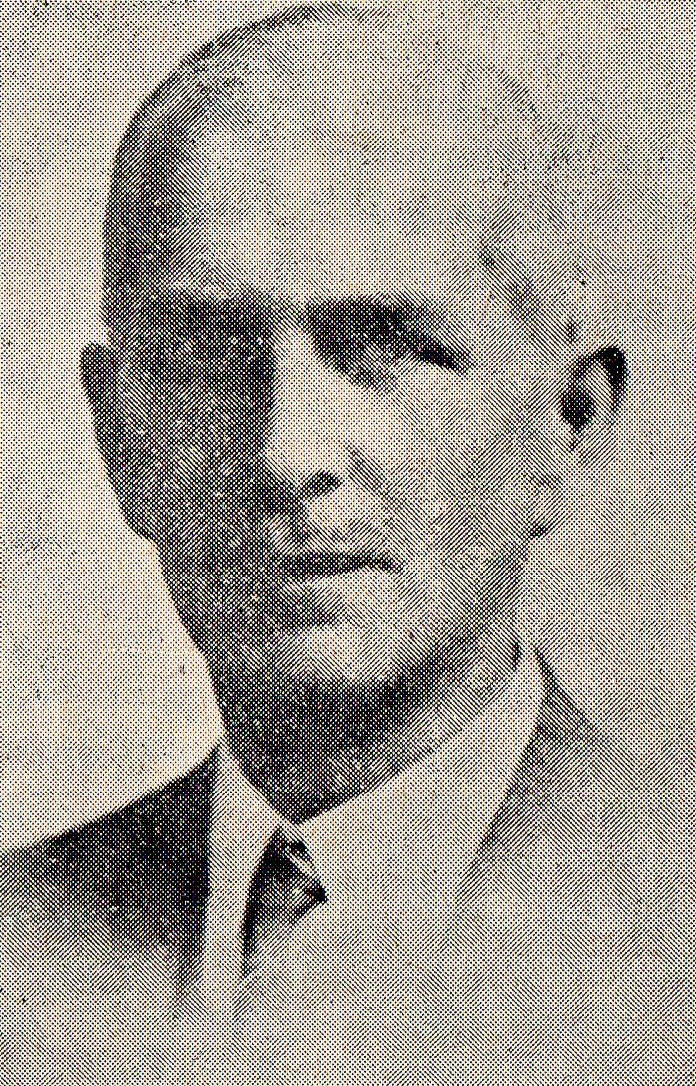
Florian Znaniecki

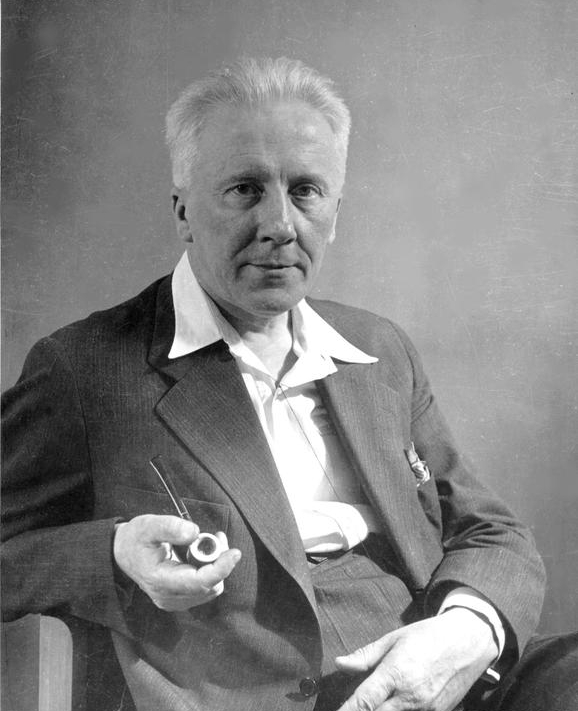
Władysław Witwicki

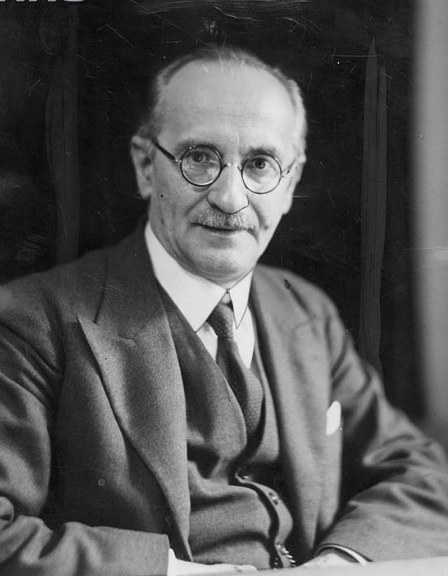
Jan Łukasiewicz

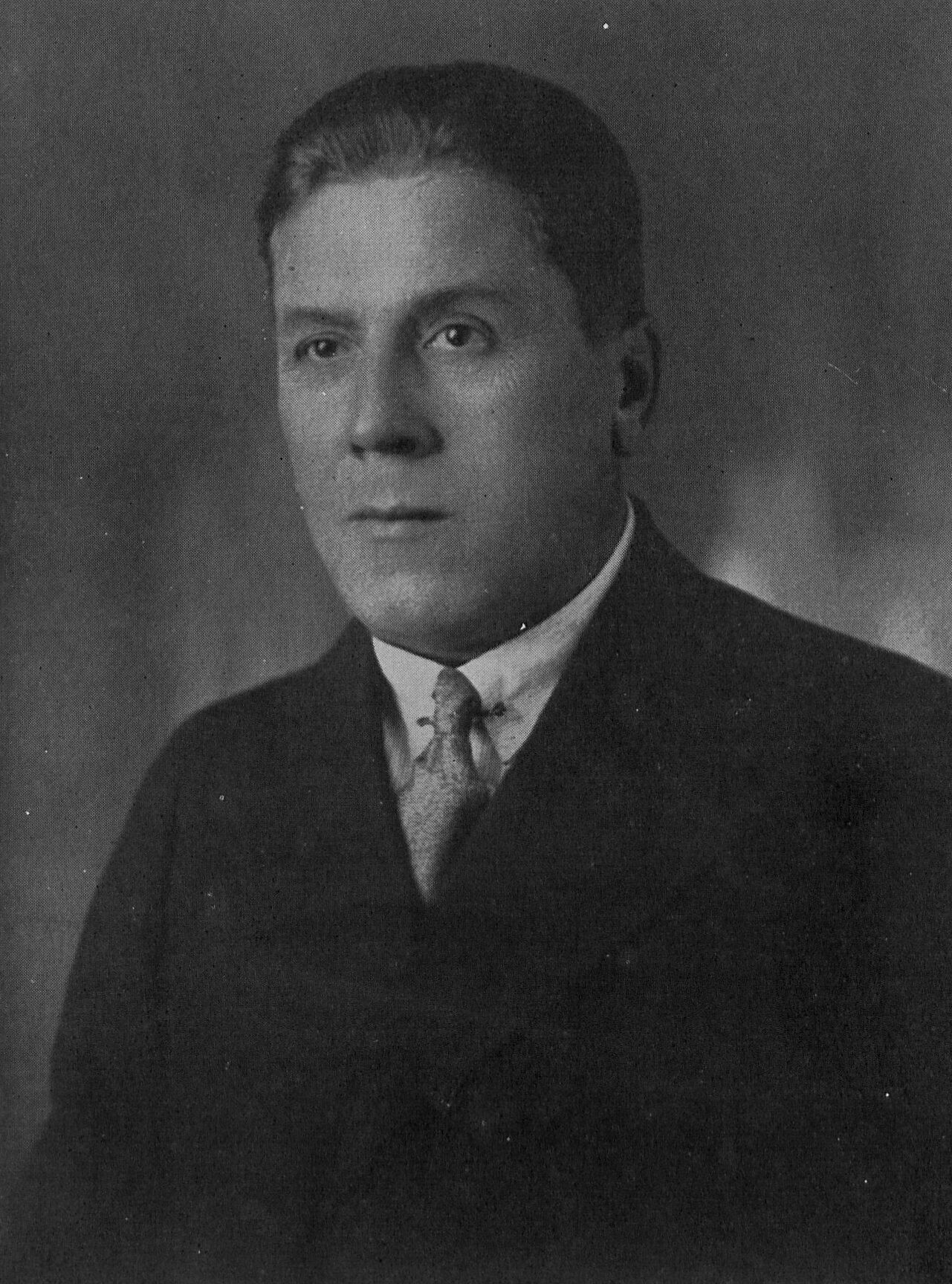
Stanisław Leśniewski

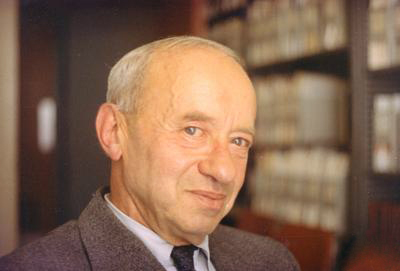
Alfred Tarski

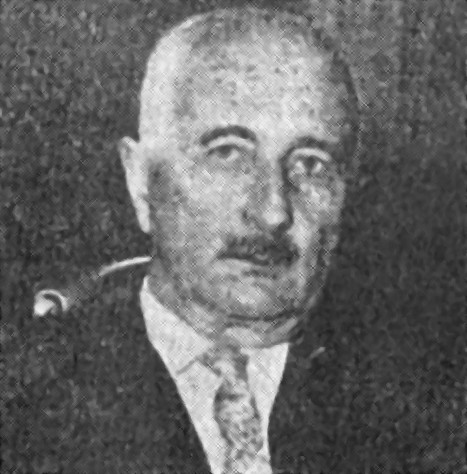
Władysław Tatarkiewicz

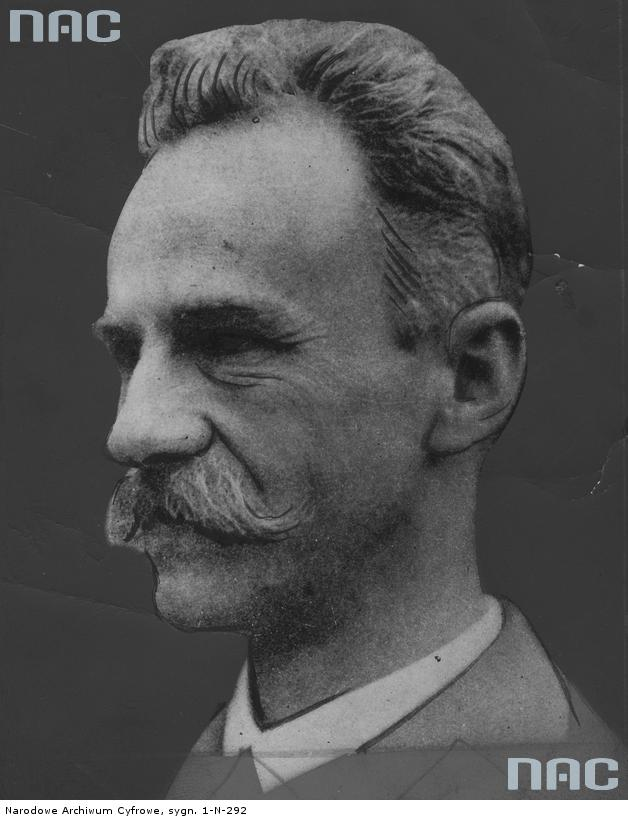
Tadeusz Kotarbiński

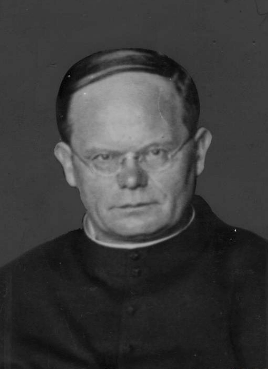
Konstanty Michalski

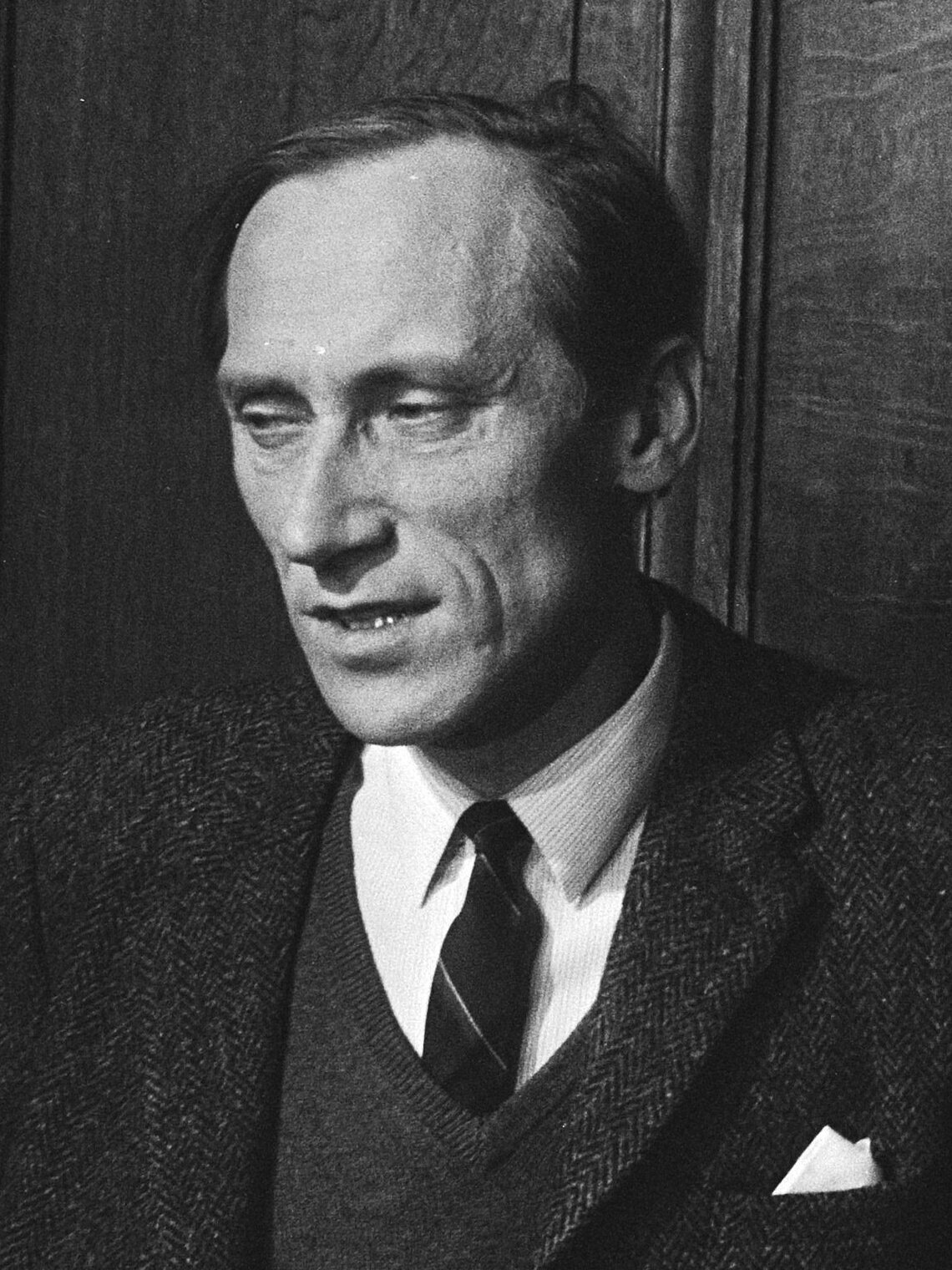
Leszek Kołakowski

== See also ==
- History of philosophy
- Polish philosophers
- List of Poles
- Andrzej Wiszowaty
