= Józef Emanuel Jankowski =

Józef Emanuel Jankowski (1790–1847) was a professor of philosophy at Kraków University.

== Life ==
Jankowski was Feliks Jaroński's successor as professor of philosophy at Kraków University from 1818 and author of a Logic.

Jankowski was one of nearly all the university professors of philosophy in Poland before the November 1830–31 Uprising who held a position that shunned both Positivism and metaphysical speculation, affined to the Scottish philosophers but linked in certain respects to Kantian critique.

== See also ==
- History of philosophy in Poland
- List of Poles
