= Adam Mahrburg =

Polish philosopher (1855–1913)

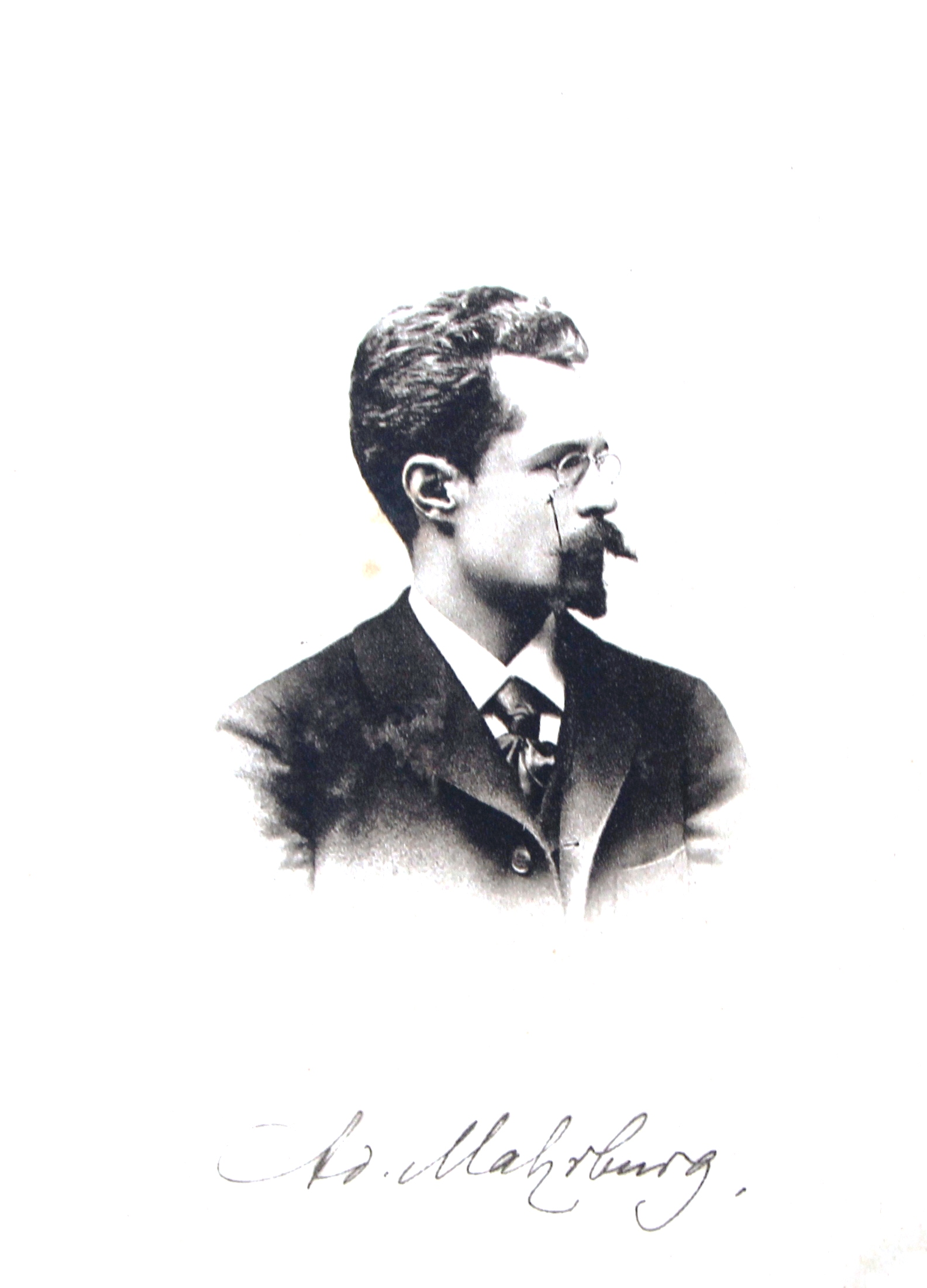
Adam Mahrburg

Adam Mahrburg (6 August 1855 – 13 November 1913) was a Polish Positivist philosopher.

== Life ==
Adam Mahrburg was a philosopher and theoretician of knowledge. He taught in Warsaw's secret university and published in learned and popular journals.

He reduced philosophy to the theory of knowledge. He regarded science as a tool for ordering and anticipating phenomena and for effective action. He was an exponent of determinism.

== Works ==
- Teoria celowości ze stanowiska naukowego (The Theory of Purpose from a Scientific Standpoint, 1888),
- Co to jest nauka (What Is Science? 1897)

== See also ==
- History of philosophy in Poland
- List of Poles
