= Władysław Weryho =

Władysław Weryho (1868–1916) was a Polish social activist, popularizer of learning, especially of philosophy and psychology, and organizer of learned life in partitioned Poland.

== Life ==
Weryho created a center of the philosophical movement in Warsaw. In 1904 he co-founded the Philosophical Society (Towarzystwo Filozoficzne) and in 1907 the Psychological Society (Towarzystwo Psychologiczne) as well as philosophical and psychological learned institutes. In 1898 he founded Przegląd Filozoficzny (The Philosophical Review), which he edited 1898–1916.

== See also ==
- History of philosophy in Poland
- List of Poles
