= Adam Ignacy Zabellewicz =

Adam Ignacy Zabellewicz (1784–1831) was a professor of philosophy at Warsaw University.

== Life ==
Zabellewicz was professor of philosophy at Warsaw University from 1818 to 1823.

Zabellewicz was one of nearly all the university professors of philosophy in Poland before the November 1830–31 Uprising who held a position that shunned both Positivism and metaphysical speculation, affined to the Scottish philosophers but linked in certain respects to Kantian critique.

== See also ==
- History of philosophy in Poland
- List of Poles
