= Jakub of Gostynin =

Polish philosopher and theologian (c. (1454–1506)

- Jakub z Gostynina
- Born: c. 1454
- Died: 16 February 1506; Kraków
- Education: University of Kraków
- Occupations: Philosopher, theologian
- Movement: Thomism

Jakub of Gostynin (Polish: Jakub z Gostynina; c. 1454 – 16 February 1506) was a Polish philosopher and theologian of the late 15th century, and Rector of the University of Kraków in 1503–1504.

== Life ==
Jakub of Gostynin was one of the chief adherents of the Cologne-style Thomism, a philosophical school that upheld the legacy of work and thought of Thomas Aquinas. Jakub's main work, entitled "Theoremata seu propositiones Auctoris Causarum", was a commentary to Liber de Causis attributed to the Greek philosopher Aristotle. He also wrote a commentary to Metaphysics by Aristotle entitled: "Expositiosuper I–XII libros „Metaphysicae” Aristotelis" as well as to his Physics. He contributed to commentaries by Paul of Venice (Paweł z Wenecji) to On the Soul (or "De Anima") by Aristotle and the theological works of Jan Versor. Jakub of Gostynin is also the author of commentaries on the Gospel of John. He donated his extensive library of manuscripts of philosophy, theology and language to the University of Kraków, the city where he died.

== See also ==
- History of philosophy in Poland
