= Władysław Mieczysław Kozłowski =

Polish philosopher (1858–1935)

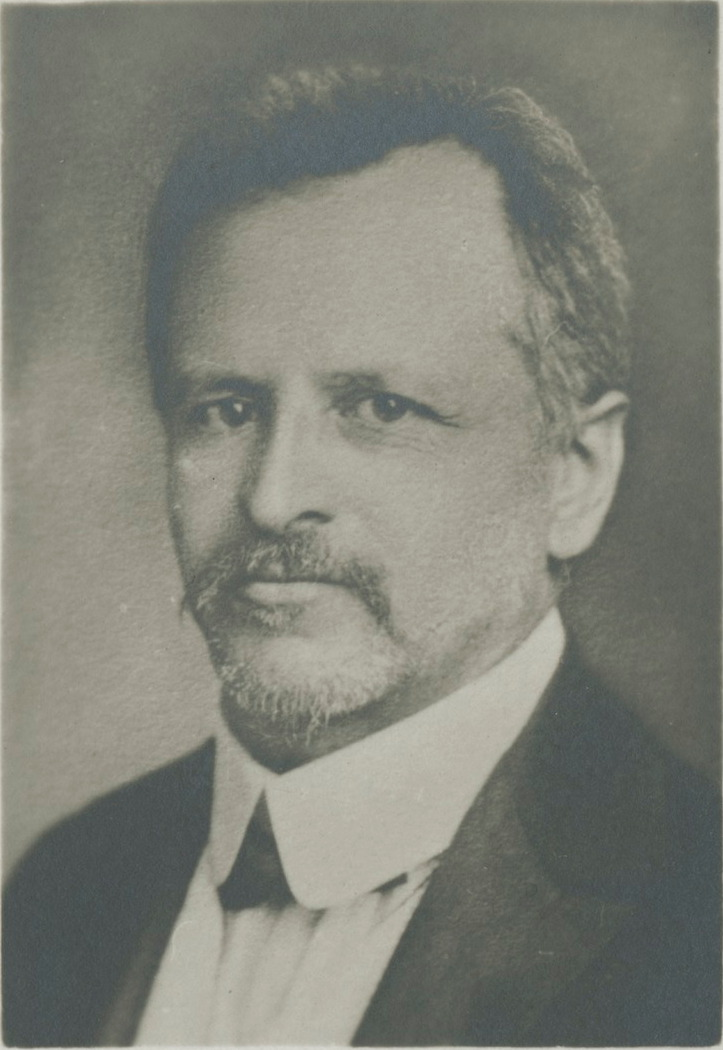
Władysław Mieczysław Kozłowski

Władysław Mieczysław Kozłowski (November 17, 1858 in Kiev – April 25, 1935 in Konstancin-Jeziorna) was a Polish philosopher.

== Life ==
Kozłowski lectured at Brussels' Université Nouvelle and at Geneva University. In 1919–28 he was professor of the theory and methodology of science at Poznań University.

His philosophical views were a synthesis of Positivism and Neo-Kantism.

== Works ==
- Przyrodoznawstwo i filozofia (Natural Science and Philosophy; 1909)
- Podstawy logiki (The Foundations of Logic; 1916).

== See also ==
- History of philosophy in Poland
- List of Poles
