= Grzegorz of Stawiszyn =

Grzegorz of Stawiszyn (Polish: Grzegorz ze Stawiszyna; 1481–1540) was a Polish philosopher and theologian. He was Rector of the University of Kraków in 1538–1540.

== Biography ==
Grzegorz was born in Stawiszyn in 1481. He was an adherent of Nominalism, a metaphysical view in philosophy, revived in western Europe at the turn of the 16th century thanks to French philosopher Jacques Lefèvre d'Étaples (Faber Stapulensis). Once Nominalism reappeared in Kraków and began taking precedence over Thomism and Scotism, Grzegorz of Stawiszyn, a Kraków professor, published Jacques d'Étaples works including his commentaries to works by Aristotle, beginning in 1510. As rector, Grzegorz introduced first reforms toward leaving the scholasticism of Peter of Spain at the University of Kraków beginning 1538, and replacing it with the Renaissance Aristotelianism, including classes in logic based on Dialectics of Jan Caesarius. He died in Kraków.
