= Feliks Jaroński =

Polish Catholic priest and philosopher (1777–1827)

Feliks Jaroński (6 June 1777 – 26 December 1827) was a Polish Catholic priest and philosopher.

== Life ==
From 1809 to 1818, Jaroński was a professor at Kraków University. A follower of Kantism, he postulated a renewal of philosophy through the rejection of empiricism and a return to metaphysics. He was the first to write a history of Polish logic.

Nevertheless [Jaroński's] Kantian sympathies were only partial. And this half-heartedness was typical of Polish Kantism in general. Polish thought was inclined at the time towards empiricism and the posture of "Common Sense" and only in particular theories agreed with Kant. Kantism had its adherents in Poland, but it was never the dominant doctrine; there was no Kantian period in Poland. First it was debarred from influence by Empiricism, then it was rivalled by the philosophy of Common Sense, and finally it was ousted by the new Idealist metaphysics.

== Works ==
- Jakiej filozofii Polacy potrzebują? (What Kind of Philosophy Do the Poles Need?, 1810)
- O filozofii (On Philosophy, parts 1–3, 1812)

== See also ==
- History of philosophy in Poland
- List of Poles
