= Eugenia Zeyland =

Polish microbiologist

Eugenia Jadwiga Zeyland (25 February 1899 – 5 January 1953) was a Polish physician and microbiologist, specialising in tuberculosis.

== Biography ==
Eugenia was born in Kraków, daughter of physician Eugeniusz Piasecki (1872–1947) and Gizela, born Szelińska. She received her education first in Lviv and then in Zakopane, where she took her Matura examinations in 1917. That same year, she started her medical studies at the Jagiellonian University. Between 1919 and 1921, she studied chemistry at the University of Poznań, where she also continued her medical training from 1922 and from which she graduated in 1924. From 1925, she worked in the University of Poznań's Department of Medical Microbiology. She undertook research trips to Germany, the Netherlands, and the United Kingdom, visiting local microbiological laboratories. In 1930, she was awarded the Pannetier Prize in Paris and in 1931 - the silver medal of the University of Poznań. She obtained her habilitation in 1937 at the Medical Faculty of the University of Warsaw, specialising in medical microbiology.

Following the German invasion of Poland in 1939, she was forcibly displaced and moved to the Główna displacement camp, from where she managed to reach Warsaw. There, she worked in the Central Tuberculosis Laboratory of the Wola Hospital, as well as taught at the underground University of Western Lands. In 1945, she moved to Istebna, as her health required clean air. Eugenia Zeyland was active until almost the very end of her life, publishing both her and her husband's work, as well as working in the local bacteriological laboratory. She died in Istebna, but was buried in the family tomb in Poznań's Jeżyce Cemetery.

On 8 December 1967, she was posthumously elected as an Honorary Fellow of the Polish Respiratory Society.

== Research ==
Eugenia Zeyland researched Mycobacterium bovis bacteria and was considered a leading expert on the bacteriology of tuberculosis during the Polish interwar period. She published ca. 50 papers in both Polish and international scientific journals, as well as a 1948 monograph on tuberculosis-causing mycobacteria.

Together with her husband, Janusz Zeyland, she pioneered the use of BCG vaccines in Poland. The couple was also able to show for the first time that the viability of the BCG bacteria depends on the quality of the growth medium and to prove that they can penetrate the walls of the gastrointestinal tract. The latter work inspired an international research programme set up by the League of Nations Health Committee in 1928.

== Personal life ==
In 1926, she married Janusz Zeyland (born 1897, died 1944), a physician, in Poznań.

== Legacy ==
The Eugenia and Janusz Zeyland Greater Poland Centre of Pulmunology and Thoracic Surgery in Poznań was named after her and her husband.
