= Adam Mickiewicz University in Poznań =

University in Poland

Coordinates: 52°24′28″N 16°54′56″E

Adam Mickiewicz University
- Uniwersytet im. Adama Mickiewicza w Poznaniu
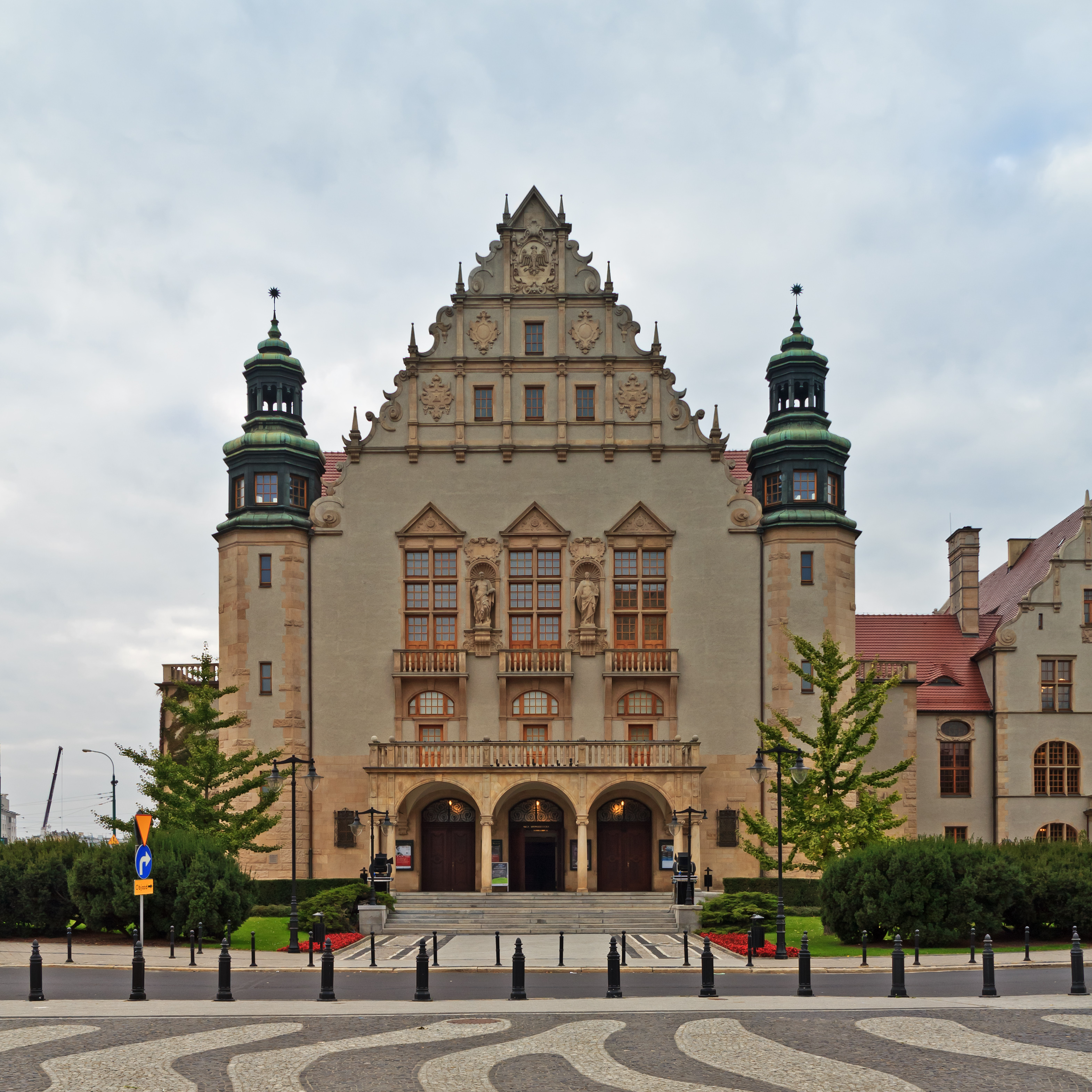
- Collegium Minus in Poznań
- Latin: Universitas Studiorum Mickiewicziana Posnaniensis
- Former names: Piast University (1919–1920); University of the Western Lands (1940–1945); University of Poznań (1920–1955)
- Type: Public university
- Established: 7 May 1919; 107 years ago
- Affiliations: EUA, EUCEN, CGU, SGroup
- Rector: Bogumiła Kaniewska
- Academic staff: ~2,996 faculty members (Fall 2018)
- Administrative staff: ~2,181 (Fall 2018)
- Students: 29,117 (December 2023)
- Doctoral students: ~1,300 (Fall 2018)
- Location: Poznań, Greater Poland Voivodeship, Poland
- Campus: Urban
- Website: amu.edu.pl/en

The Adam Mickiewicz University (Polish: Uniwersytet im. Adama Mickiewicza w Poznaniu; Latin: Universitas Studiorum Mickiewicziana Posnaniensis) is a research university in Poznań, Poland. Due to its history, the university is traditionally considered among Poland's most reputable institutions of higher learning, this standing equally being reflected in national rankings.

It traces its origins to 1611, when under the Royal Charter granted by King Sigismund III Vasa, the Jesuit College became the first university in Poznań. The Poznań Society for the Advancement of Arts and Sciences which played an important role in leading Poznań to its reputation as a chief intellectual centre during the Age of Positivism and partitions of Poland, initiated founding of the university. The inauguration ceremony of the newly founded institution took place on 7 May 1919 that is 308 years after it was formally established by the Polish king and on 400th anniversary of the foundation of the Lubrański Academy which is considered its predecessor. Its original name was Piast University (Polish: Wszechnica Piastowska), which later in 1920 was renamed to University of Poznań (Polish: Uniwersytet Poznański). During World War II staff and students of the university opened an underground Polish University of the Western Lands (Polish: Uniwersytet Ziem Zachodnich). In 1955 University of Poznań adopted a new patron, the 19th-century Polish Romantic poet Adam Mickiewicz, and changed to its current name.

The university is organized into six principal academic units—five research schools consisting of twenty faculties and the doctoral school—with campuses throughout the historic Old Town and Morasko. The university employs roughly 4,000 academics, and has more than 40,000 students who study in some 80 disciplines. More than half of the student body are women. The language of instruction is usually Polish, although several degrees are offered in either German or English. The university library is one of Poland's largest, and houses one of Europe's largest Masonic collections, including the 1723 edition of James Anderson's The Constitutions of the Free-Masons.

The university is currently publishing over 79 research journals, most of them on Pressto publishing platform based on Open Journal System. Adam Mickiewicz University Repository (AMUR) contains over 23,704 records of research publications and is one of the first research repositories in Poland.

Adam Mickiewicz University is a member of the European University Association, EUCEN, SGroup European Universities' Network, Compostela Group of Universities and EPICUR.

== History ==
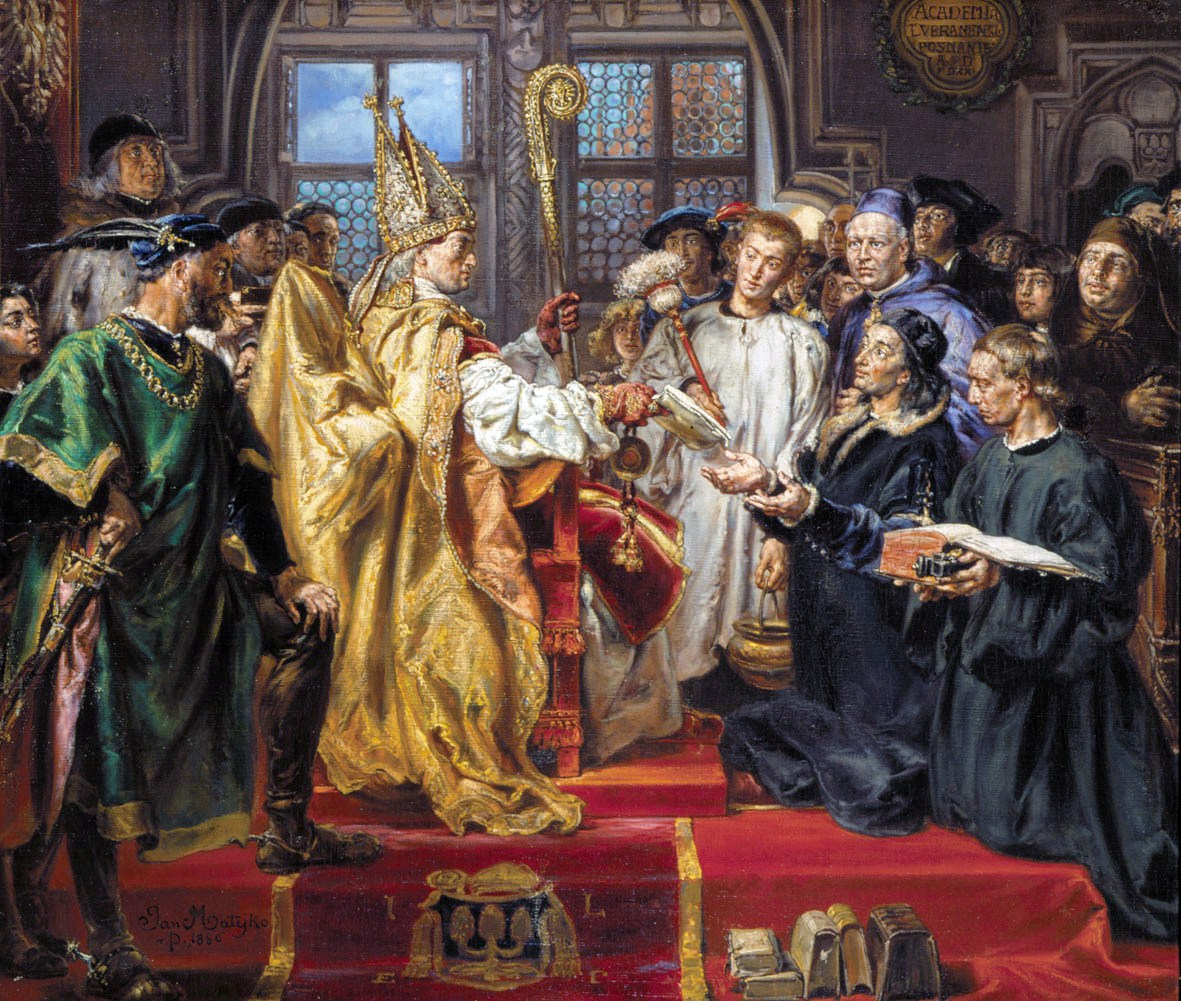
The founding of the Lubrański Academy in 1518, painted by Jan Matejko (1886).

From the beginning, the history of the Adam Mickiewicz University has been inextricably linked to the history of Poznań itself and in some measure – the history of the entire Republic of Poland, which, partitioned by the neighboring countries (Prussia, Austria-Hungary and Russia) towards the end of the eighteenth century disappeared from the European map for more than a hundred years. On 28 October 1611, when under the Royal Charter granted by King Sigismund III Vasa, the Jesuit College became the first university in Poznań. These edicts were later affirmed with charters issued by King John II Casimir in 1650, and King John III Sobieski in 1678, the university in Poznań lasted until 1773. Based on these charters, the university granted scholar degrees to its members.

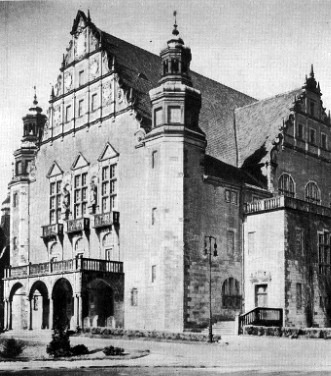
Collegium Minus as a part of Nazi Reichsuniversität Posen (1941)

The inauguration ceremony of the newly founded took place on 7 May 1919, that is 308 years after it was formally established by the Polish king and the 400th anniversary of the foundation of the Lubrański Academy which is considered its spiritual predecessor. Its original name was Piast University (Polish: Wszechnica Piastowska), which later in 1920, was renamed to the University of Poznań (Polish: Uniwersytet Poznański). In 1920, sociologist Florian Znaniecki founded the first Polish department of sociology at the university, one of the first such departments in Europe. In the same period of the university's history, botanist Józef Paczoski founded the world's first institute of phytosociology.

After the invasion of Poland, Poznań was annexed by Germany and the university was closed by the Nazis in 1939. It was reopened as a German university in 1941, which operated until 1944. Staff and students of the Polish university, some of them expelled by Germans to Warsaw, opened an underground Polish University of the Western Lands (Polish: Uniwersytet Ziem Zachodnich), whose classes met in private apartments (see Education in Poland during World War II). Many of the professors and staff were imprisoned and executed in Fort VII in Poznań, including professor Stanisław Pawłowski (rector in the years 1932–33). The Polish university reopened, in much smaller form, after the end of World War II. In 1950, the Medical Faculty, including the Dentistry section and the Faculty of Pharmacy, were split off to form a separate institution, now the Poznań University of Medical Sciences. In 1955, the University of Poznań adopted a new patron, the 19th-century Polish Romantic poet Adam Mickiewicz, and changed to its current name.

== Sites ==
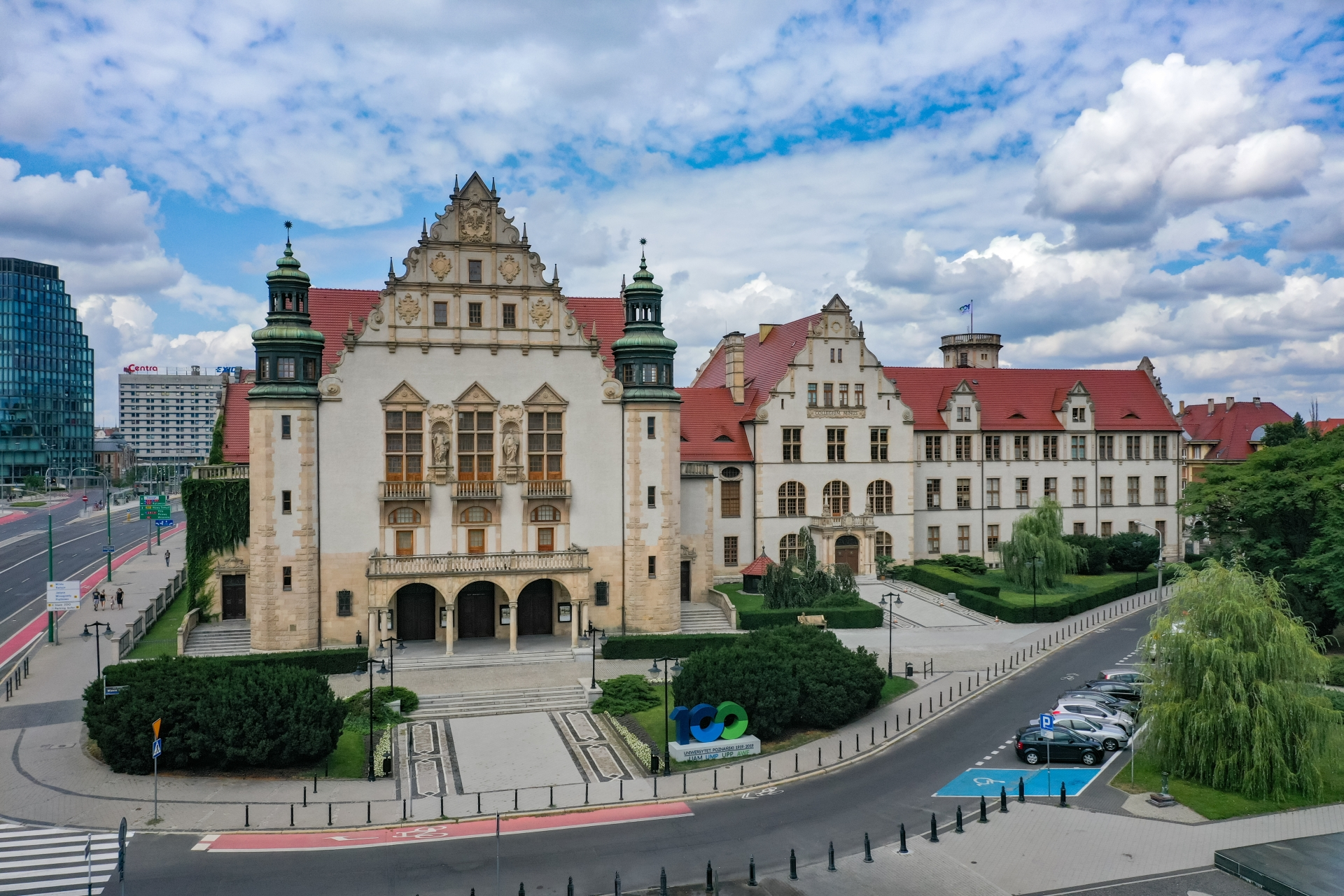
Collegium Minus (2019)

The university's central administrative building is Collegium Minus, on the west side of Adam Mickiewicz Square at the western end of the street Święty Marcin. (This is one of a group of buildings, including the Imperial Palace, built in the first decade of the 20th century while Poznań was still under German rule; it originally housed a Royal Academy.) Adjoining this is the Aula, which is frequently used for ceremonies and for classical music concerts, and Collegium Iuridicum (accommodating the law faculty). Some teaching takes place in Collegium Maius, another of the aforementioned group of buildings (on ul. Fredry), although this is mainly used by the medical university. Other buildings in the city centre include former communist party headquarters on Święty Marcin, Collegium Novum (used mainly for language teaching) on Al. Niepodległości, and the university library on ul. Ratajczaka.

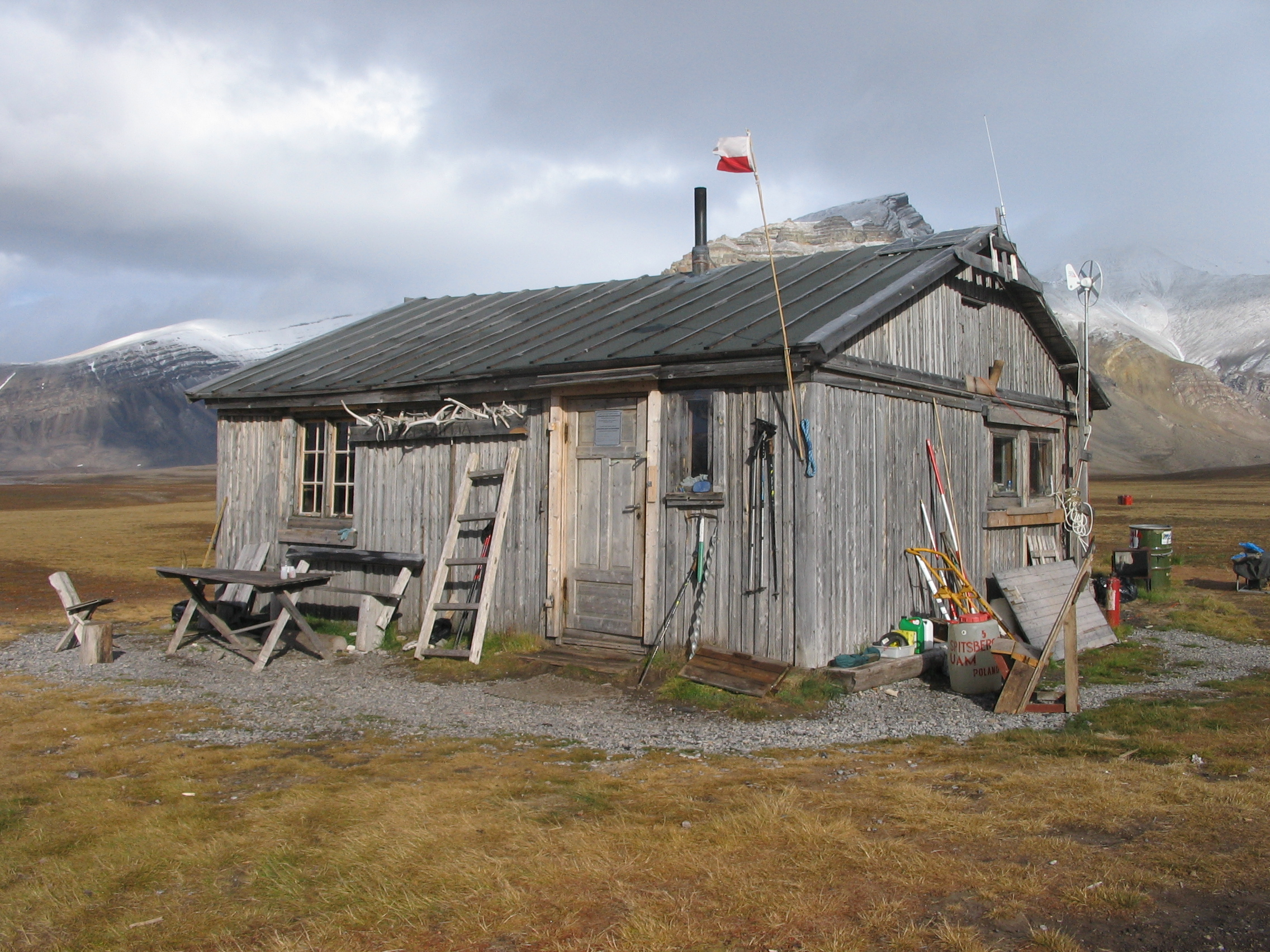
Skottehytta – venue of until 2009. Since then the Adam Mickiewicz University Polar Station is located in container on opposite side of the bay.

The university also uses a number of other buildings in southern and western districts of Poznań. However, it is strongly developing its site at Morasko in the north of the city. As of 2006, the faculties of physics, mathematics and computer science, biology, geographical and geological science had moved to the new location. In 2015 they were joined by the faculty of history (Collegium Historicum Novum).

The university also has external branches in other towns of western Poland, including Kalisz, Ostrów Wielkopolski and Słubice. Adam Mickiewicz University maintains close cooperation with Viadrina European University, Germany. The two universities jointly operate the Collegium Polonicum, located just opposite Viadrina on the Polish side of the Oder River.

University owns a seasonal polar research station located in the Petuniabukta (Petunia Bay), in the Northern part of Billefjord, and central part of Spitsbergen island in the Svalbard archipelago.

As of 2024, Adam Mickiewicz University owns and operates retreats in three historical palaces in the Wielkopolska region: the Rococo Ciążeń Palace (built in 1768), the Classicist Gułtowy Palace (built in 1786), and the Neo-Renaissance Palace in Obrzycko (built in 1862).

Palaces owned by the Adam Mickiewicz University

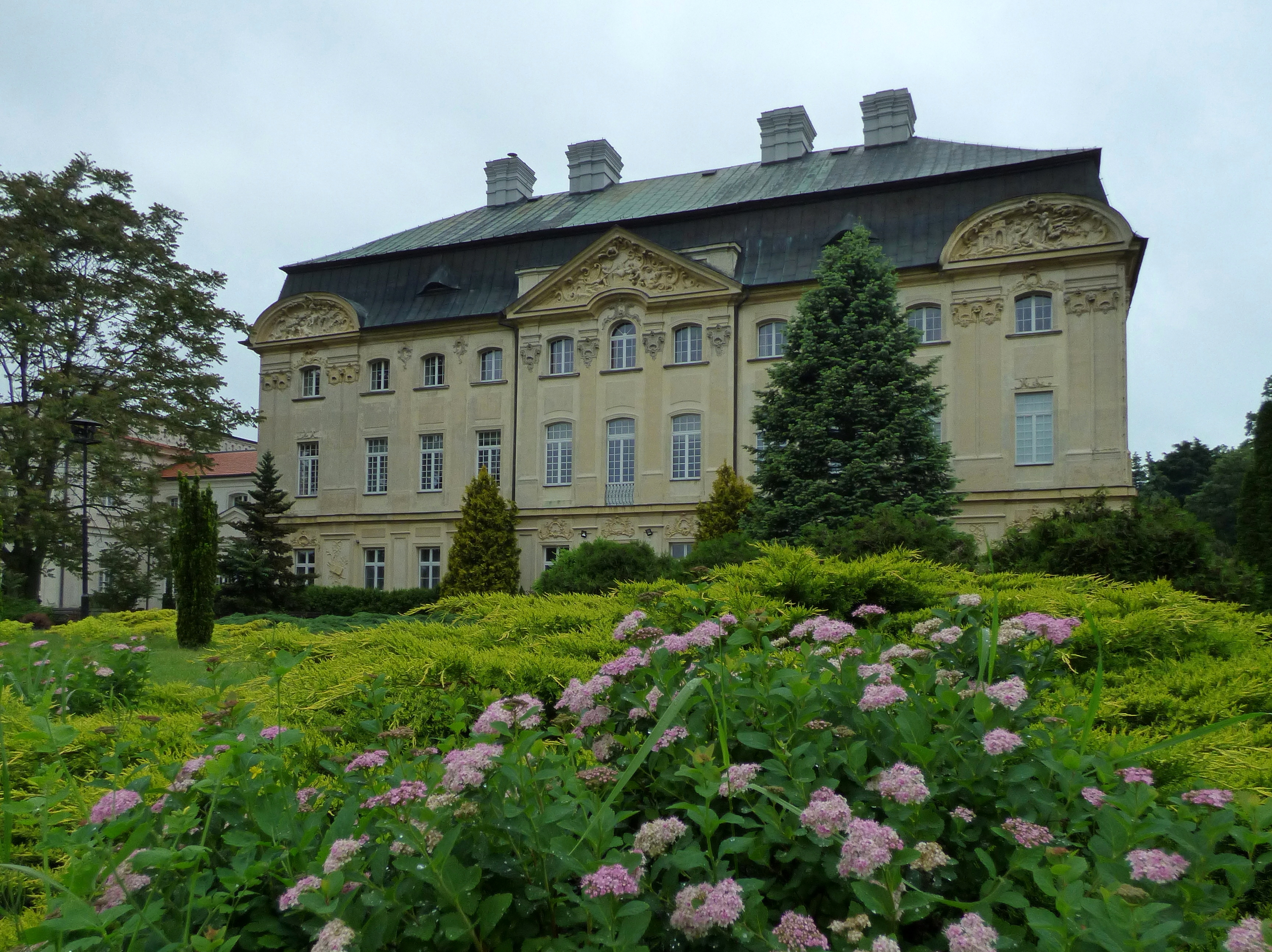
Ciążeń

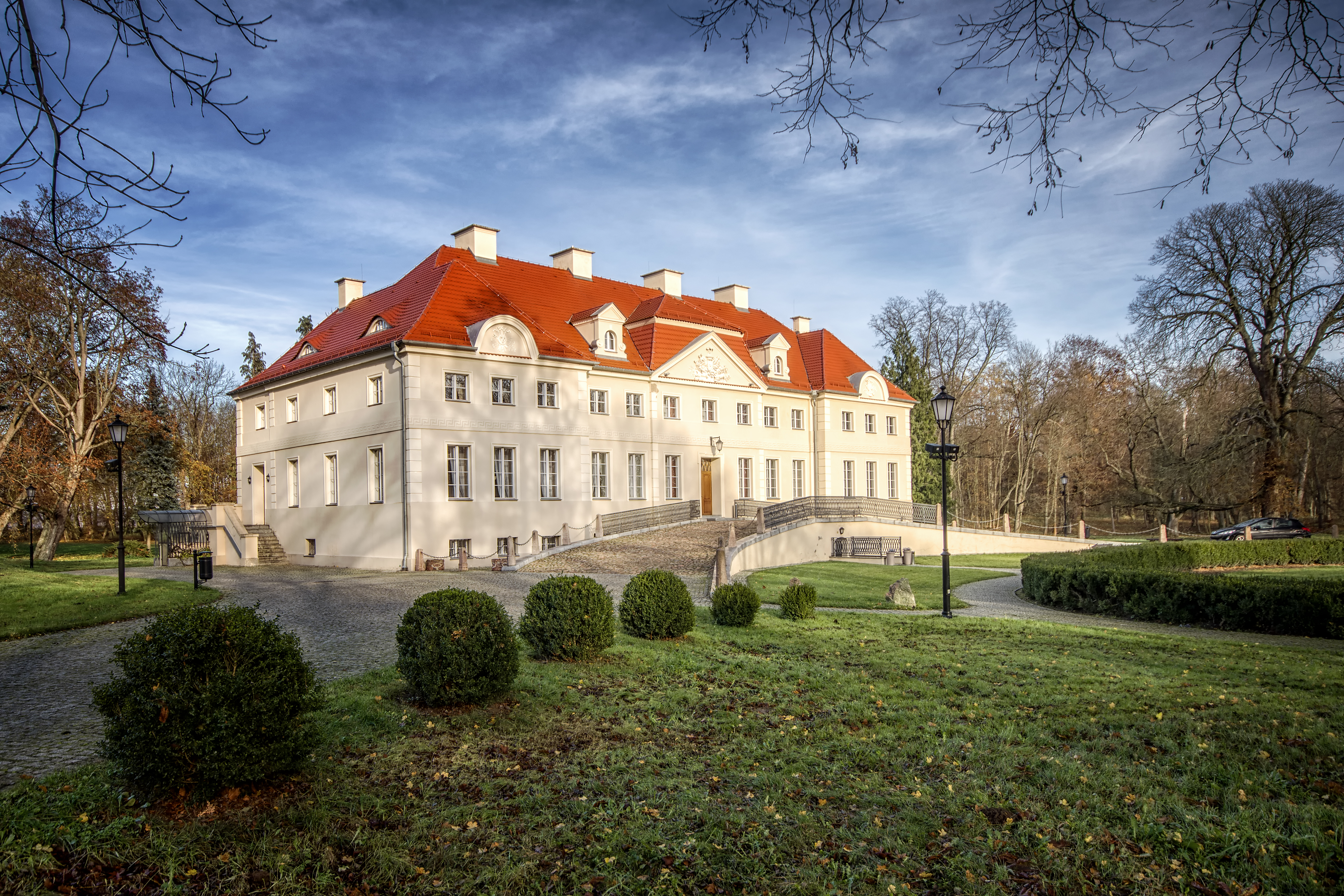
Gułtowy

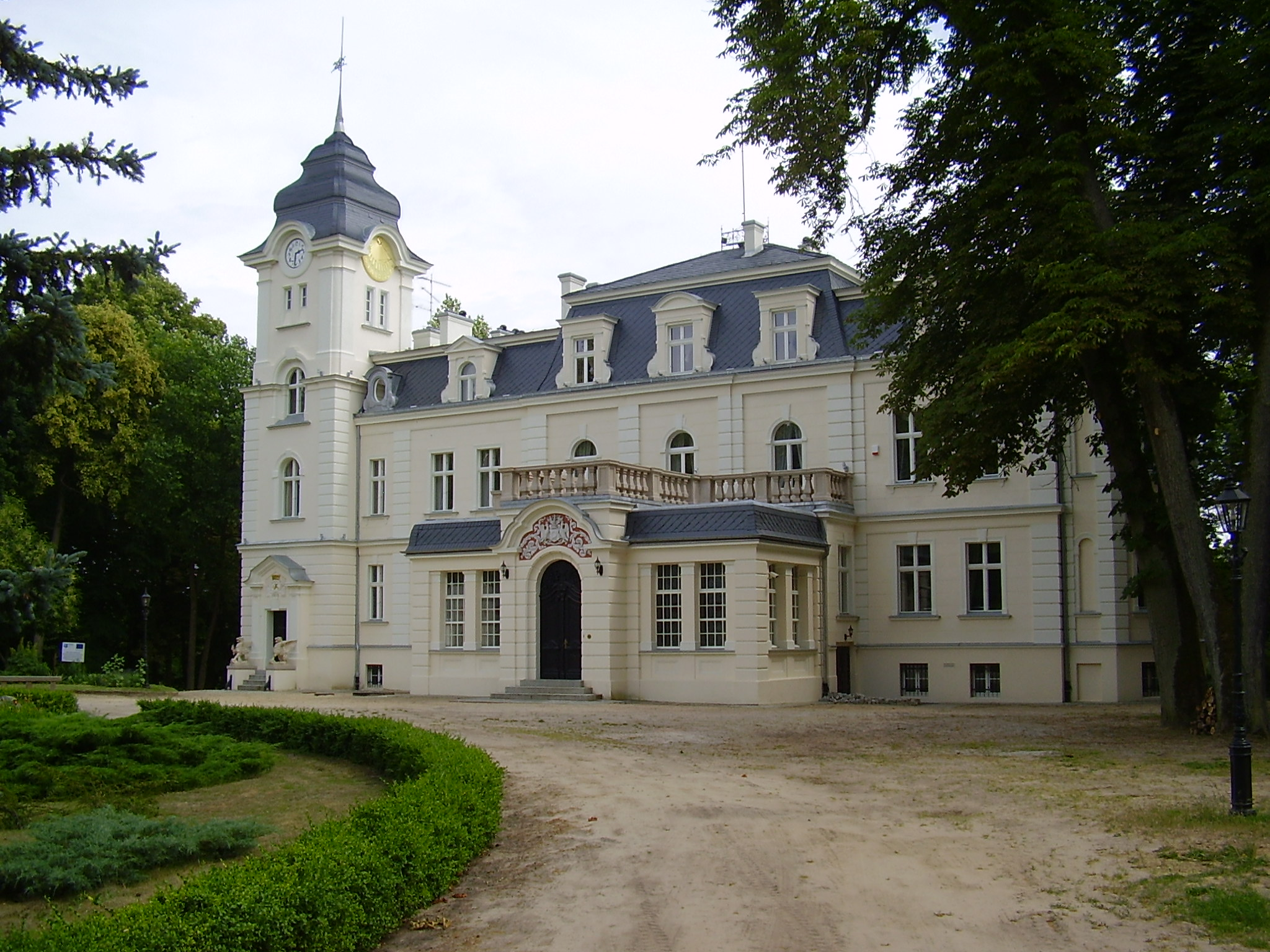
Obrzycko

== Staff and student numbers ==
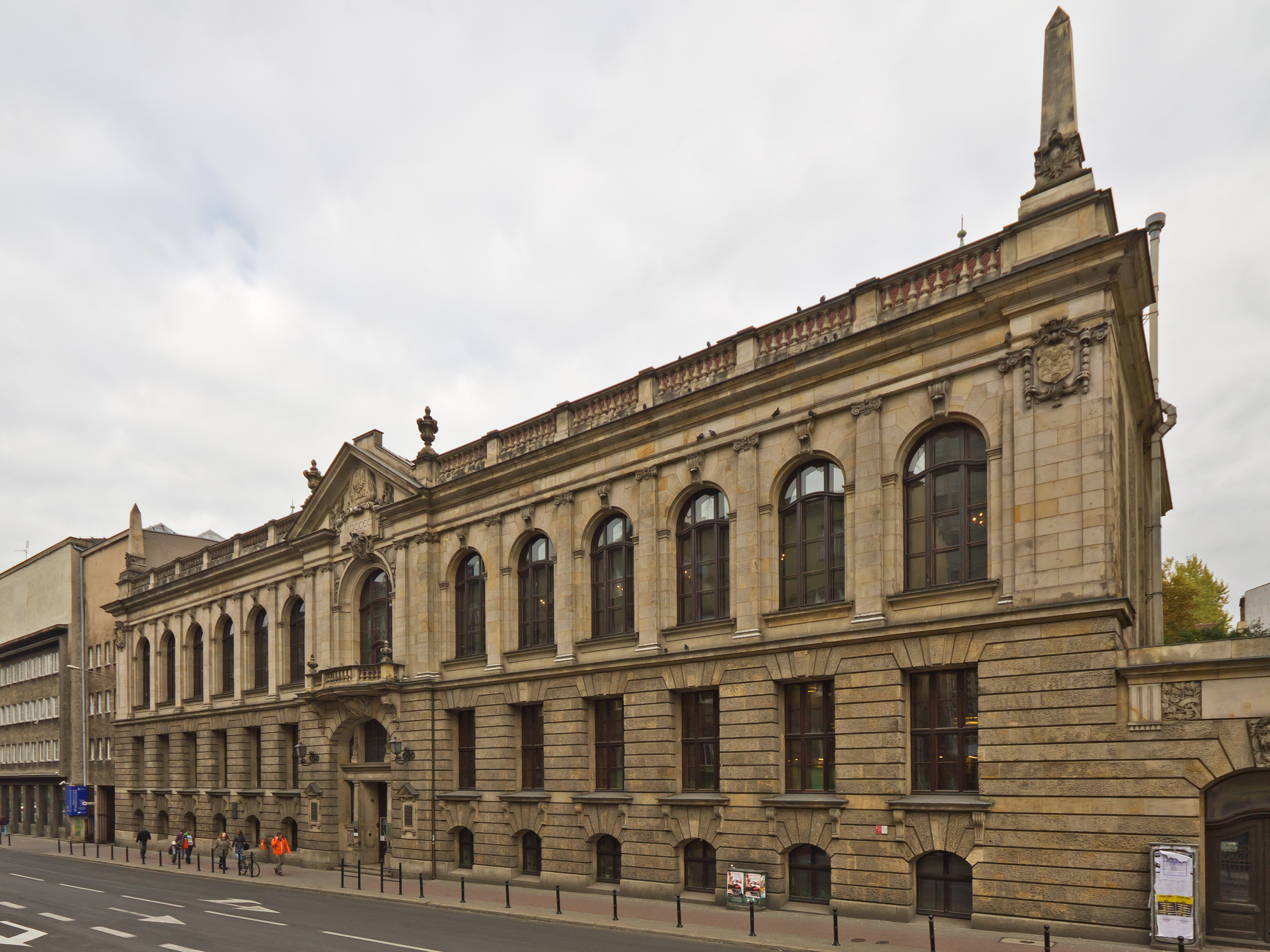
University Library (opened in 1902 as Kaiser-Wilhelm-Bibliothek)

At the start of the 2008/2009 academic year, the university had 46,817 undergraduates (including about 18,000 on weekend or evening courses), 1308 doctoral students, and 2247 other post-graduate students. The number of undergraduates declined slightly between 2005 and 2008.

At the end of 2008, the university had a total of 2892 teaching staff, including 257 full professors and 490 associate/assistant professors. It also had 2120 other employees.

== Reputation ==
University rankings

Global – Overall
- ARWU World: 901–1000 (2025)
- QS World: 741–750 (2026)
- THE World: 1001–1200 (2026)

Global – Liberal arts
- QS Arts & Humanities: 371 (2020)

Regional – Overall
- QS Emerging Europe and Central Asia: 52 (2022)

The Adam Mickiewicz University is one of the top Polish universities. It was ranked by Perspektywy magazine as the third best Polish university. International rankings such as ARWU and QS University Rankings rank the university as the fourth best Polish higher level institution.

On the list of the best Emerging Europe and Central Asia universities compiled by QS University Rankings, the Adam Mickiewicz University was placed as 60th. In 2020, QS World University Ranking by Subject positioned the Adam Mickiewicz University as one of the best higher level institutions among the top 101–150 in Linguistics, 251–300 in English studies, 371 in Arts & Humanities and 551–600 in Physics & Astronomy, Chemistry and Biology.

== Degrees ==
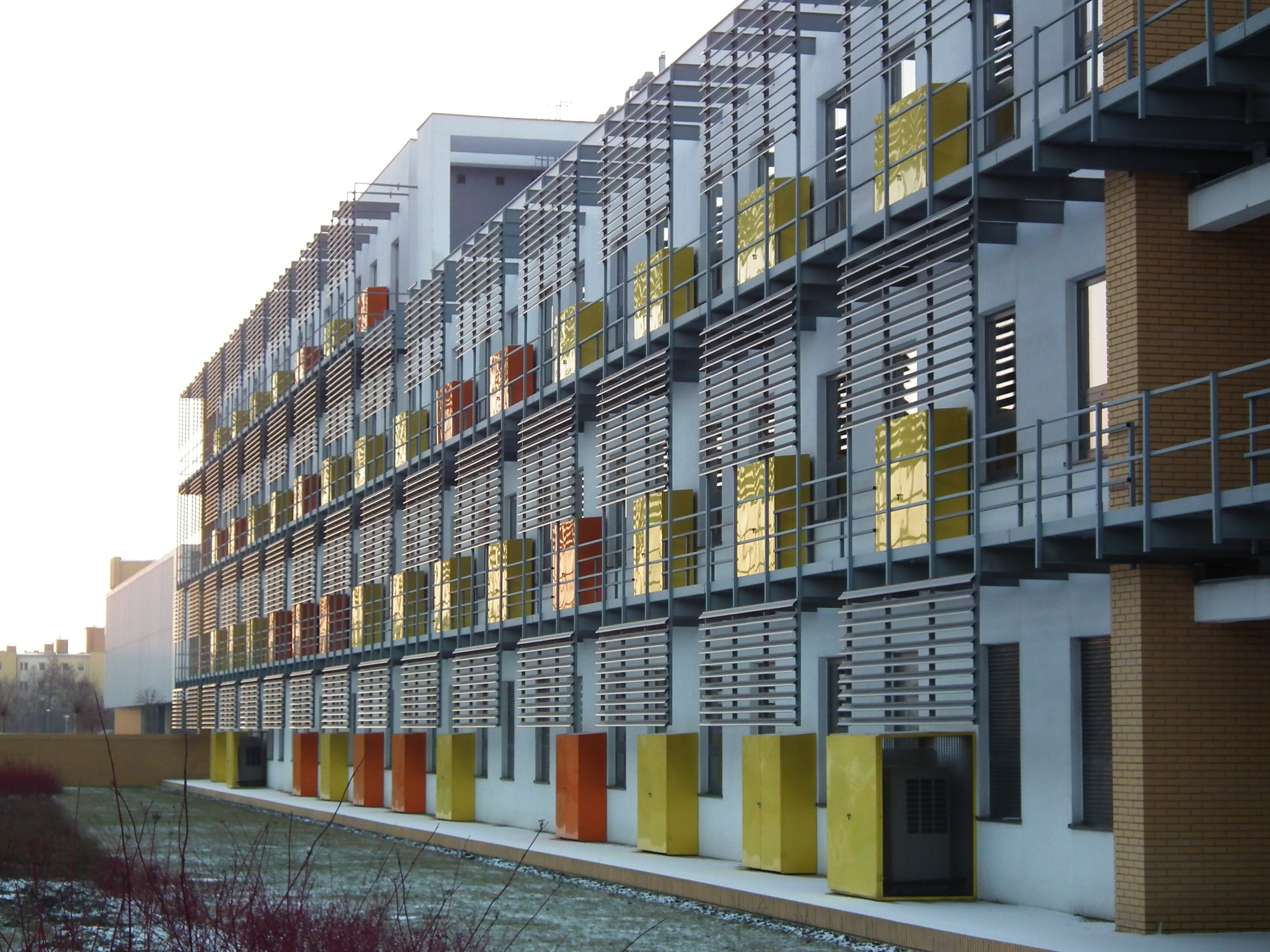
Collegium Chemicum Novum – Faculty of Chemistry (2017)

Like most Polish universities, Adam Mickiewicz University awards the following degrees:

- licencjat, normally a three-year course, sometimes considered equivalent to a Bachelor of Arts or Bachelor of Science degree
- magister, normally a two-year course following the licencjat, considered equivalent to a Master of Arts or Master of Science degree
- doctorates
- habilitations

== Schools and faculties ==
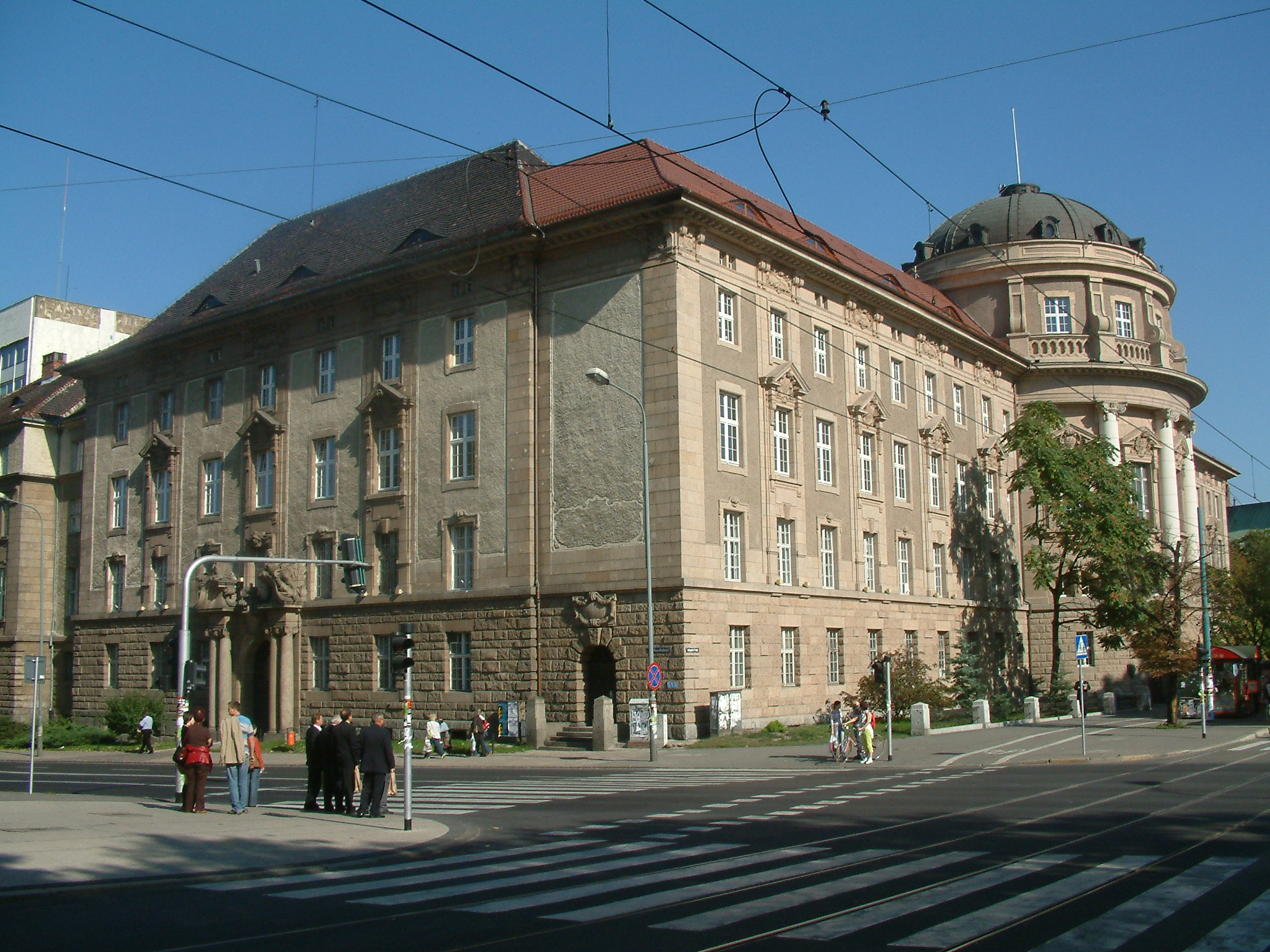
Collegium Maius – Faculty of Polish and Classical Philology

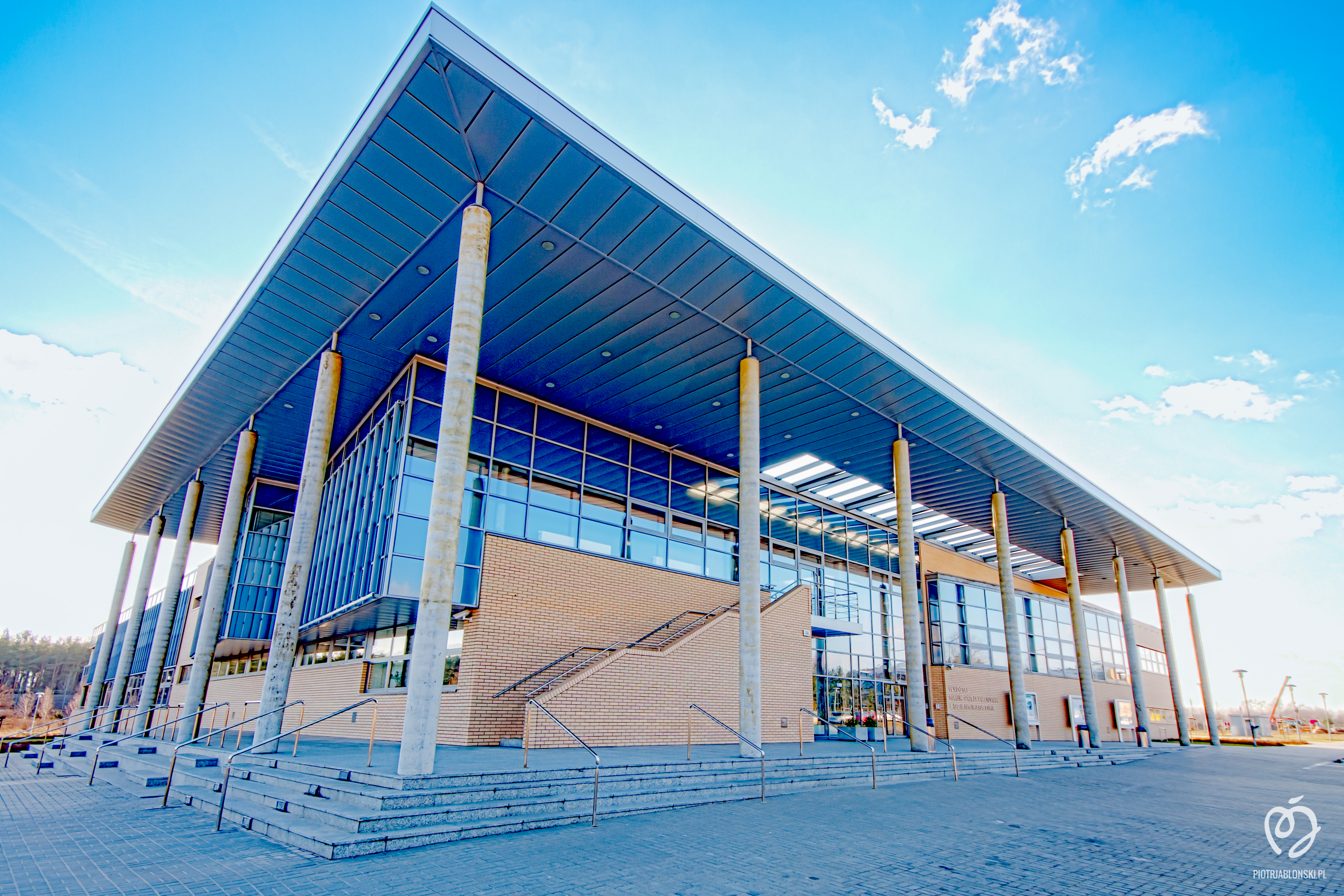
Faculty of Political Science and Journalism – Campus Morasko

- School of Natural Sciences
  - Faculty of Biology
  - Faculty of Geographic and Geological Sciences
- School of Exact Sciences
  - Faculty of Chemistry
  - Faculty of Physics
  - Faculty of Mathematics and Computer Science
- School of Social Sciences
  - Faculty of Human Geography and Planning
  - Faculty of Political Science and Journalism
  - Faculty of Law and Administration
  - Faculty of Psychology and Cognitive Science
  - Faculty of Sociology
  - Faculty of Educational Studies
- School of Humanities
  - Faculty of Anthropology and Cultural Studies
  - Faculty of Archeology Studies
  - Faculty of Philosophy
  - Faculty of History
  - Faculty of Arts Studies
  - Faculty of Theology
- School of Languages and Literatures
  - Faculty of English
  - Faculty of Polish and Classical Philology
  - Faculty of Modern Languages and Literatures
- Doctoral School of Adam Mickiewicz University

== People ==
=== Notable alumni and staff ===
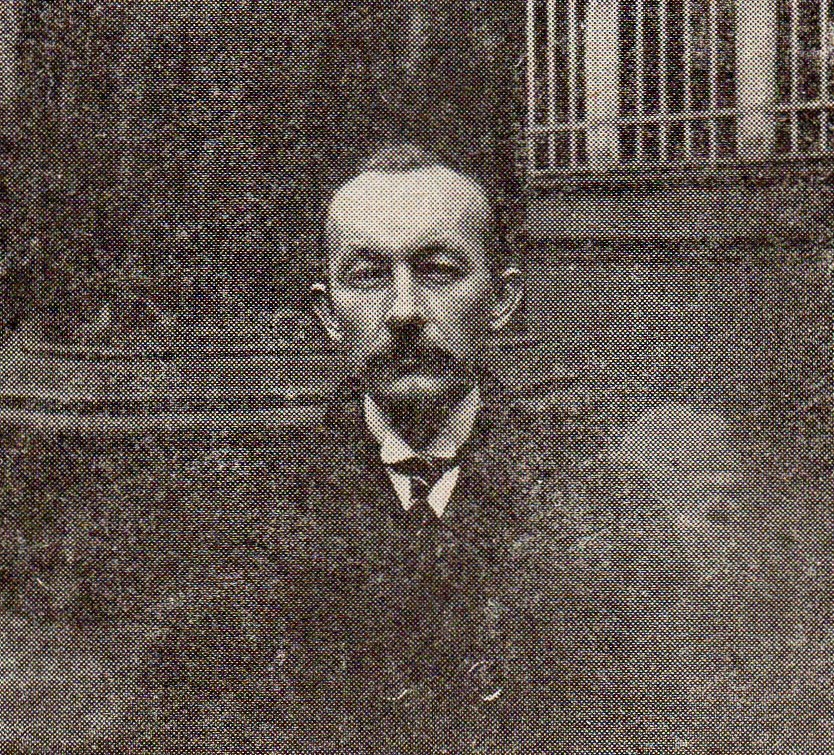
Józef Kostrzewski, one of the founding fathers of the university (1924)

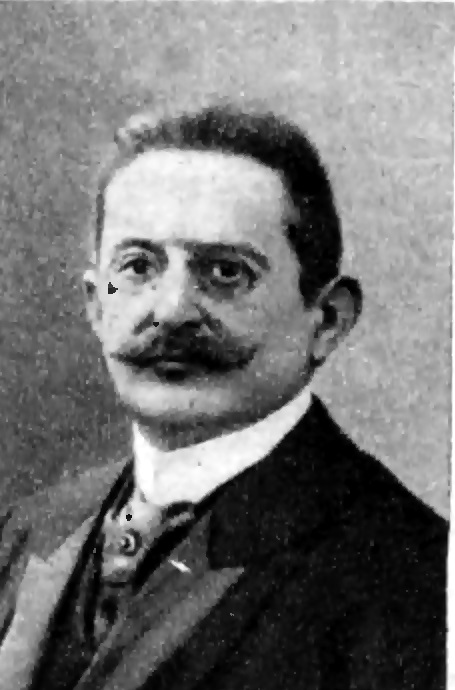
Heliodor Święcicki, first rector of the university (1920)

Adam Mickiewicz University's prestige and large class size have enabled it to graduate a large number of distinguished alumni.

Many AMU alumni are leaders and innovators in the business world, as well as prominents in society and the arts. Its graduates include authors (Kazimiera Iłłakowiczówna, Ryszard Krynicki, Stanisław Barańczak), journalists (Adam Michnik, Max Kolonko), entrepreneurs (Jan Kulczyk, Grażyna Kulczyk); composer Jan A. P. Kaczmarek, the recipient of the Academy Award for Best Original Score (2004); theatre practitioner Lech Raczak, film director Filip Bajon and literary critic and a music aficionado, Jerzy Waldorff. One of the most notable resistance fighters of the Home Army during Second World War, Jan Nowak-Jeziorański majored in economics in 1936, he worked as an assistant professor at the university.

Notable academic staff included:

- archeologists: Józef Kostrzewski;
- biologists: Zygmunt Tobolewski;
- historians: Stanisław Kozierowski, Gerard Labuda, Henryk Łowmiański, Anna Wolff-Powęska;
- legal scholars: Zygmunt Ziembiński, Czesław Znamierowski, Antoni Peretiatkowicz, Michał Sczaniecki, Sławomira Wronkowska-Jaśkiewicz, Witalis Ludwiczak;
- philosophers: Kazimierz Ajdukiewicz, Władysław Tatarkiewicz, Leszek Nowak;
- mathematicians: Władysław Orlicz, Władysław Ślebodziński;
- linguists: Wiktor Jassem, Grażyna Vetulani;
- literature scholars: Zygmunt Szweykowski, Edward Balcerzan, Stanisław Barańczak;
- sociologists: Florian Znaniecki.
Presidents of the Council of Ministers

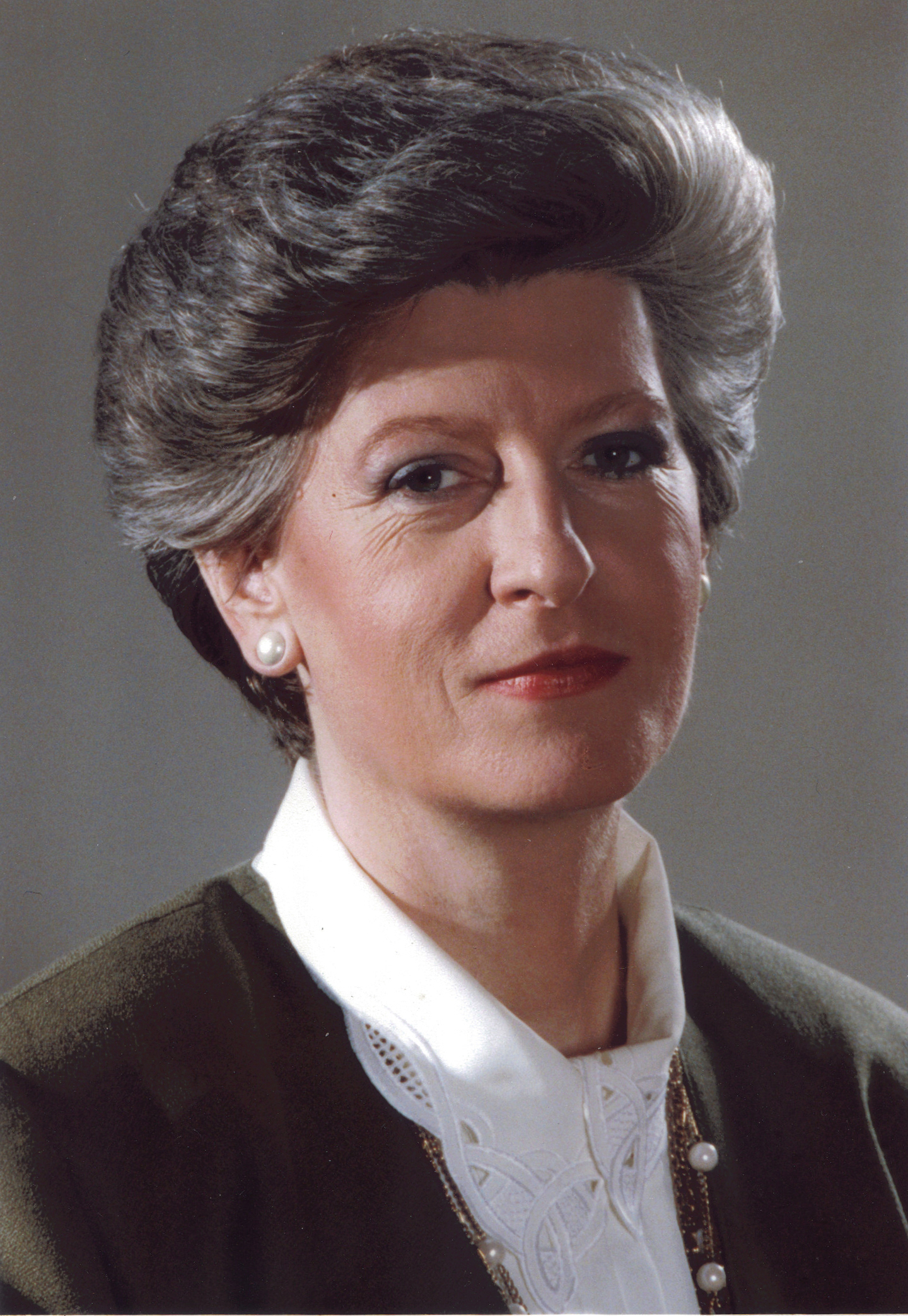
Hanna Suchocka, 5th Prime Minister of Poland

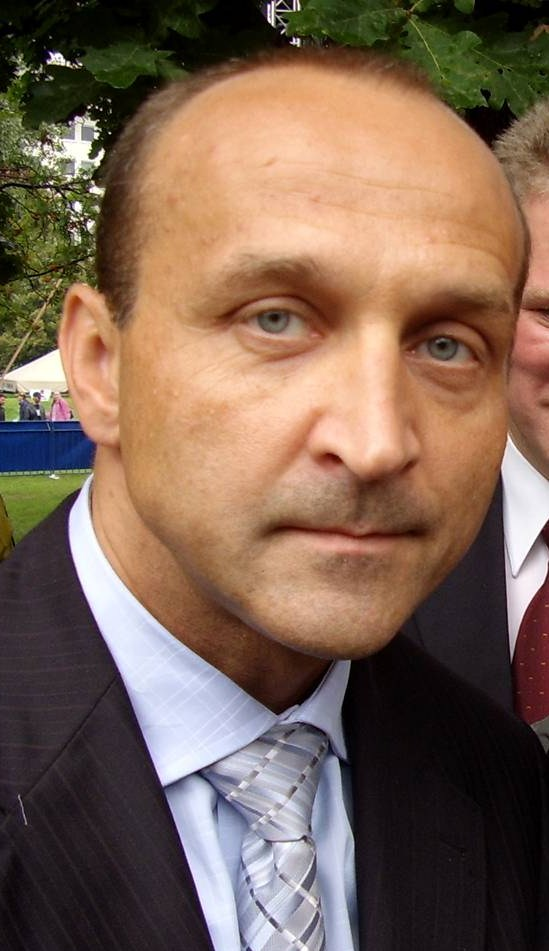
Kazimierz Marcinkiewicz, 12th Prime Minister of Poland

Hanna Suchocka, 5th Prime Minister of Poland, first woman to hold this post in Poland and the 14th woman to be appointed and serve as prime minister in the world, graduated from university. Additionally, Kazimierz Marcinkiewicz, the 12th Prime Minister of Poland and Roman Giertych, the Deputy Prime Minister of Poland and Minister of National Education between 2006 and 2007, are graduates.

Three graduates of the university have served as Marshals of the Sejm and Senate of the Republic of Poland. Józef Zych, Deputy Marshal of the Sejm (1991–1995, 2001–2005), Marshal of the Sejm (1995–1997), Senior Marshal (2005, 2011); Marek Jurek, Marshal of the Sejm (2005–2007); Rafał Grupiński, Deputy Marshal of the Senate (from 2023).

Bohdan Winiarski was one of the longest-serving Judges of the International Court of Justice (1946–1967) and between 1961 and 1964 its president. Additionally, Krzysztof Skubiszewski, Minister of Foreign Affairs (1989–1993), was the Judge sitting ad hoc on the Court (1993–2004), also Paweł Wiliński, Professor of Jurisprudence, chair in Criminal Procedure, served as the Judge sitting ad hoc on the European Court of Human Rights for two terms (2010–2012, 2015–2016).

Three of the school's graduates, including Alfons Klafkowski (1985–1989), Mieczysław Tyczka (1989–1993) and Julia Przyłębska (since 2016), have served as the Presidents of the Constitutional Tribunal of the Republic of Poland. Three of the current fifteen members of the court graduated from AMU: Julia Przyłębska, Andrzej Zielonacki and Justyn Piskorski. Additionally, the President of Poland, Andrzej Duda, refused to swear in Roman Hauser, former President of the Supreme Administrative Court of Poland and Krzysztof Ślebzak as the Tribunal's judges.

Among the university's notable graduates are also:

- Bogumił Brzezinski (b. 1943), chemist
- Krzysztof Czyżewski (b. 1958), author
- Elżbieta Frąckowiak (b. 1950), electrochemical engineer
- Franciszek Gągor (1951–2010), general, Chief of the General Staff of the Polish Armed Forces
- Krzysztof Grabowski (b. 1965), poet and singer
- Maciej Henneberg (b. 1949), Polish-Australian anatomist and communist-era dissident
- Anna Jantar (1950–1980), singer
- Tomasz Jasiński (b. 1951), historian
- Paweł Kisielow (born 1945), immunologist
- Włodzimierz Kołos (1928–1996), chemist and physicist, one of the founders of modern quantum chemistry
- Dominika Kulczyk (b. 1977), sinologist, businesswoman and philanthropist
- Tomasz Łuczak (b. 1963), mathematician
- Crocheted Olek (b. 1978), New York-based Polish-American artist
- Halszka Osmólska (1930–2008), paleontologist
- Karolina Pawliczak (b. 1976), lawyer and politician
- Helena Polaczkówna (1881–1942), historian, archivist, war activist
- Jan Sokołowski (1899–1982), zoologist
- Adam Szłapka (b. 1984), politician, leader of the Modern political party
- Wanda Wesołowska (b. 1950), zoologist
- Jan Węglarz (b. 1947), computer scientist

=== The Enigma Codebreakers ===
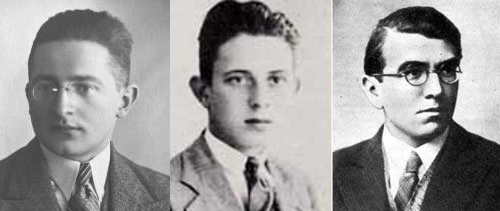
Marian Rejewski, Jerzy Różycki and Henryk Zygalski, Polish mathematicians and cryptologists who worked at breaking the German Enigma ciphers before and during World War II

In the 1920s the German military began using a 3-rotor Enigma, whose security was increased in 1930 by the addition of a plugboard. The Polish Cipher Bureau sought to break it due to the threat that Poland faced from Germany, but its early attempts did not succeed. Near the beginning of 1929, the Polish Cipher Bureau realized that mathematicians may make good codebreakers; the bureau invited math students at University of Poznań to take a class on cryptology.

After the class, the Bureau recruited some students to work part-time at a Bureau branch set up in Poznań for the students. The branch operated for some time. On 1 September 1932, 27-year-old Polish mathematician Marian Rejewski and two fellow Poznań University mathematics graduates, Henryk Zygalski and Jerzy Różycki, joined the Bureau full-time and moved to Warsaw. Their first task was to reconstruct a four-letter German naval cipher.

=== Honorary doctors ===
Recipients of honorary doctorates from the university include Marshal Józef Piłsudski, Marshal Ferdinand Foch, Marie Curie, Ignacy Paderewski, Roman Dmowski, Witold Hensel, Ernst Håkon Jahr, Al Gore, J. M. Coetzee, Krzysztof Matyjaszewski, Robert Maxwell and Orhan Pamuk, the recipient of the 2006 Nobel Prize in Literature.

Wisława Szymborska, recipient of the 1996 Nobel Prize in Literature, received a degree of Honorary Doctor of Letters of Adam Mickiewicz University in 1995, and it's the only honorary doctorate she has ever accepted.

== List of rectors ==
- 1919–1923: Heliodor Święcicki (1854–1923), doctor and philanthropist
- 1923–1924: Zygmunt Lisowski (1880–1955), lawyer
- 1924–1925: Stanisław Dobrzycki (1875–1931), Slavic language specialist
- 1925–1926: Ludwik Sitowski (1880–1947), zoologist
- 1926–1928: Jan Gabriel Grochmalicki (1883–1936), zoologist
- 1928–1929: Edward Lubicz-Niezabitowski (1875–1946), doctor and zoologist
- 1929–1931: Stanisław Kasznica (1874–1958), lawyer
- 1931–1932: Jan Sajdak (1882–1967), classical philologist
- 1932–1933: Stanisław Pawłowski (1882–1940), geographer
- 1933–1936: Stanisław Runge (1888–1953), veterinarian
- 1936–1939: Antoni Peretiatkowicz (1884–1956), lawyer
- 1939: Bronisław Niklewski (1879–1961), plant physiologist
- 1945–1946: Stefan Tytus Dąbrowski (1877–1947), doctor and physiologist
- 1946–1948: Stefan Błachowski (1889–1962), psychologist
- 1948–1952: Kazimierz Ajdukiewicz (1890–1963), philosopher and logician
- 1952–1956: Jerzy Suszko (1889–1972), chemist
- 1956–1962: Alfons Klafkowski (1912–1992), lawyer
- 1962–1965: Gerard Labuda (1916–2010), historian
- 1965–1972: Czesław Łuczak (1922–2002), historian
- 1972–1981: Benon Miśkiewicz (1930–2008), historian
- 1981–1982: Janusz Ziółkowski (1924–2000), economist and sociologist
- 1982–1984: Zbigniew Radwański (1924–2012), lawyer
- 1984–1985: Franciszek Kaczmarek (1928–2015), physicist and mathematician
- 1985–1988: Jacek Fisiak (1936–2019), English philologist
- 1988–1990: Bogdan Marciniec (born 1941), chemist
- 1990–1996: Jerzy Fedorowski (born 1934), geologist
- 1996–2002: Stefan Jurga (1946–2022), physicist
- 2002–2008: Stanisław Lorenc (1943–2020), geologist
- 2008–2016: Bronisław Marciniak (born 1950), chemist
- 2016–2020: Andrzej Lesicki (born 1950), biologist
- 2020– : Bogumiła Kaniewska (born 1964), Polish philologist

== Gallery ==
Adam Mickiewicz University
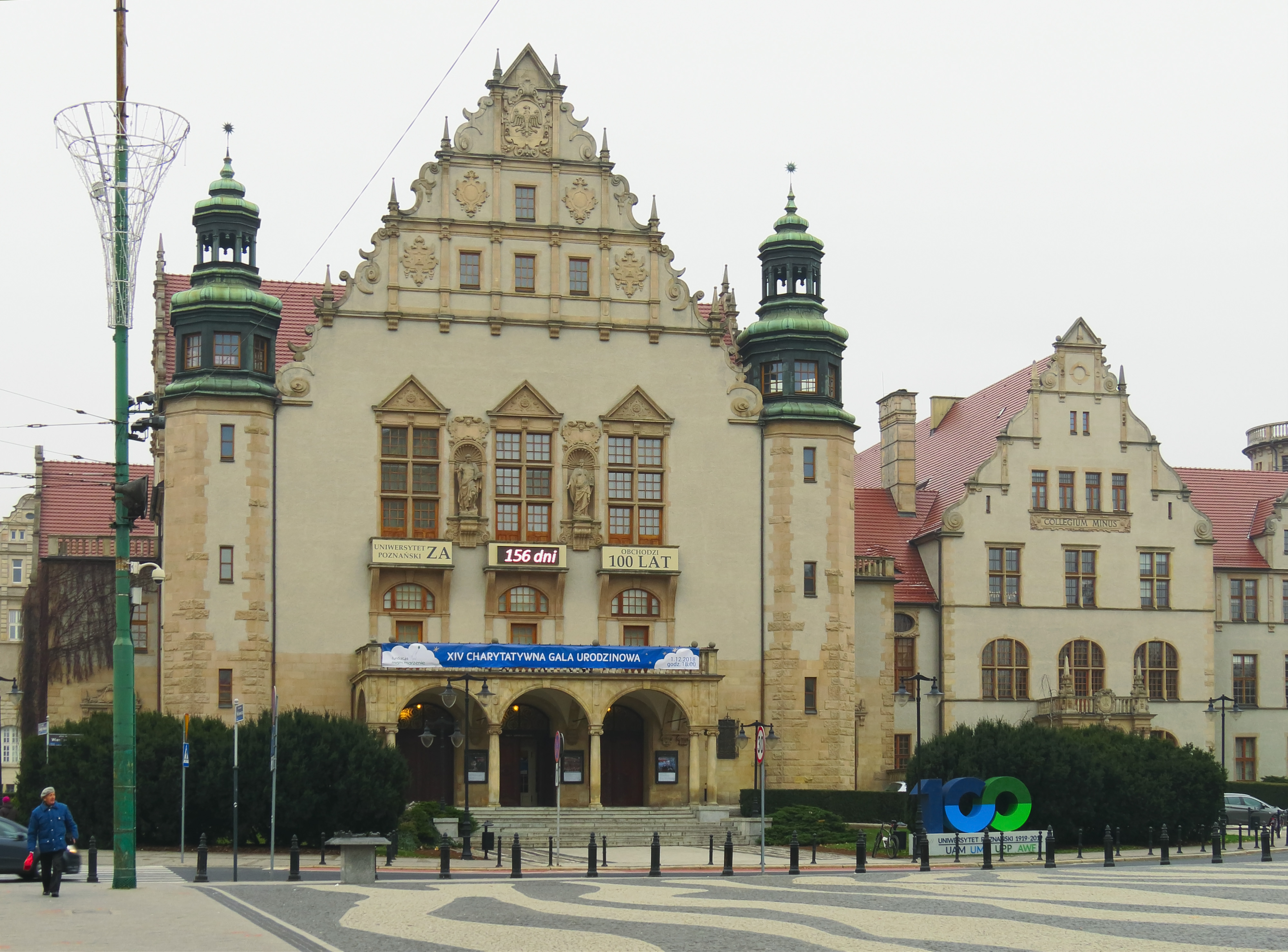
Collegium Minus

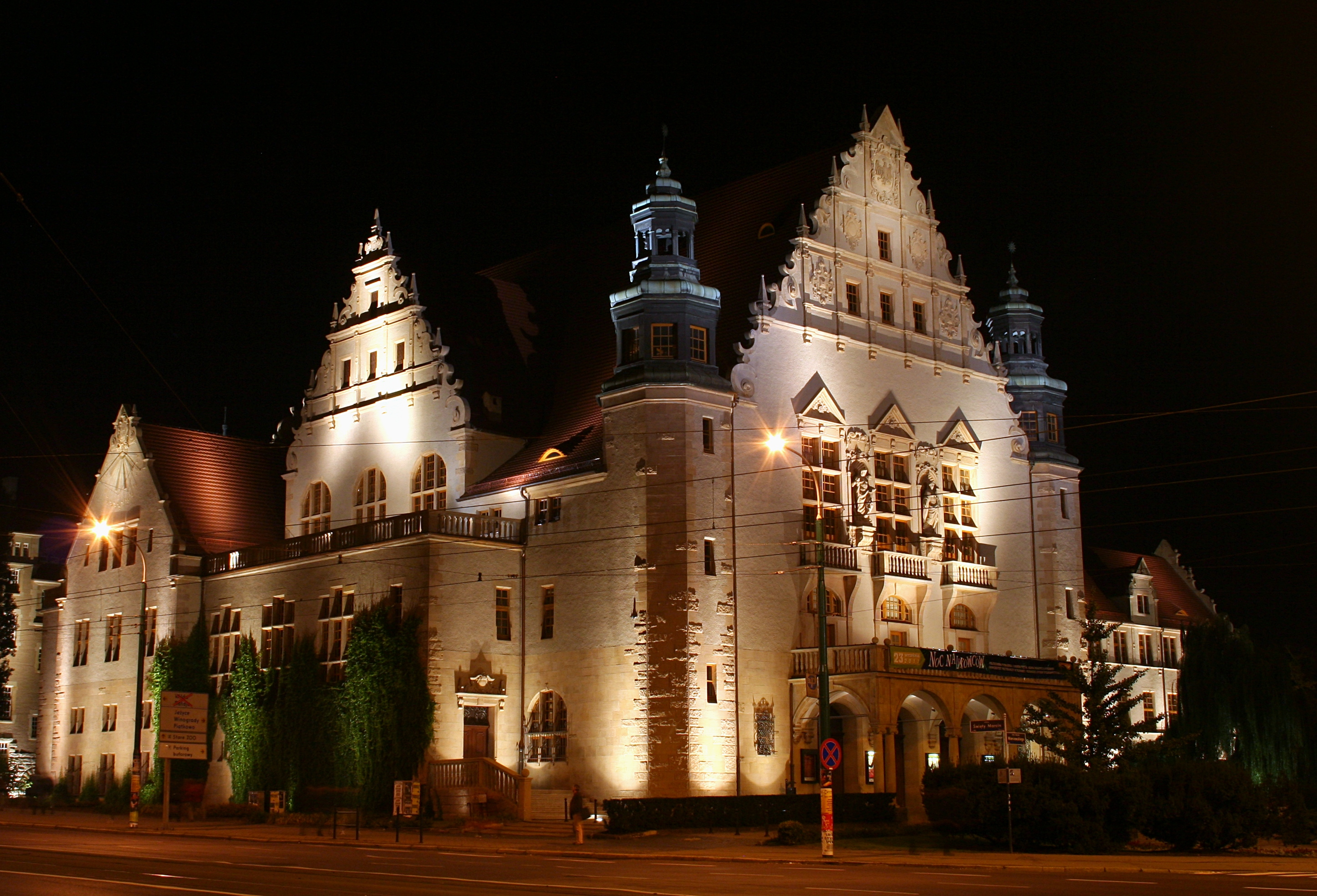
South view of Collegium Minus

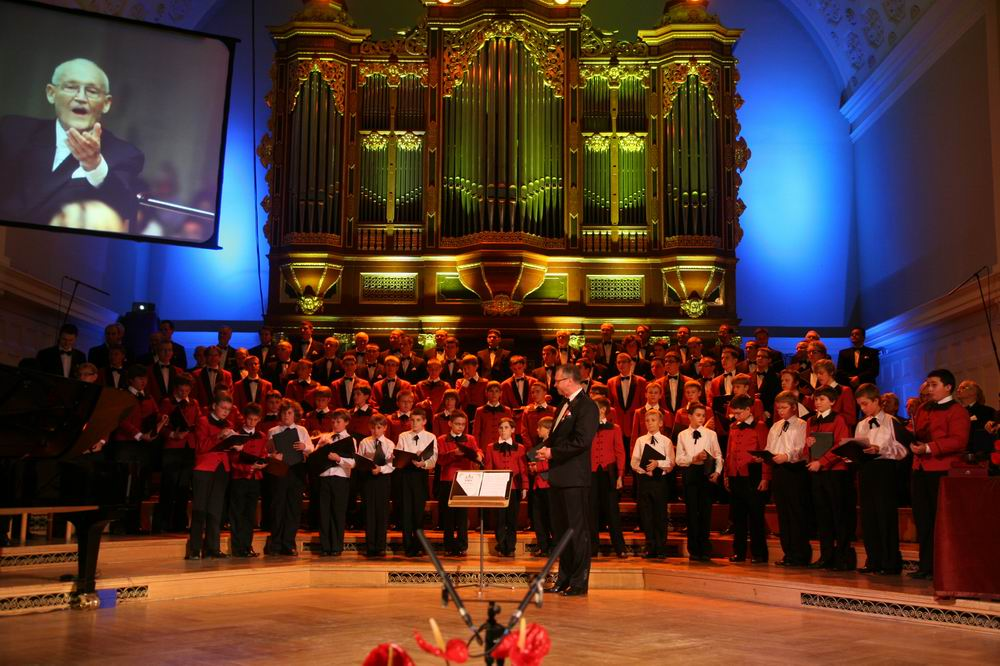
Aula of Collegium Minus

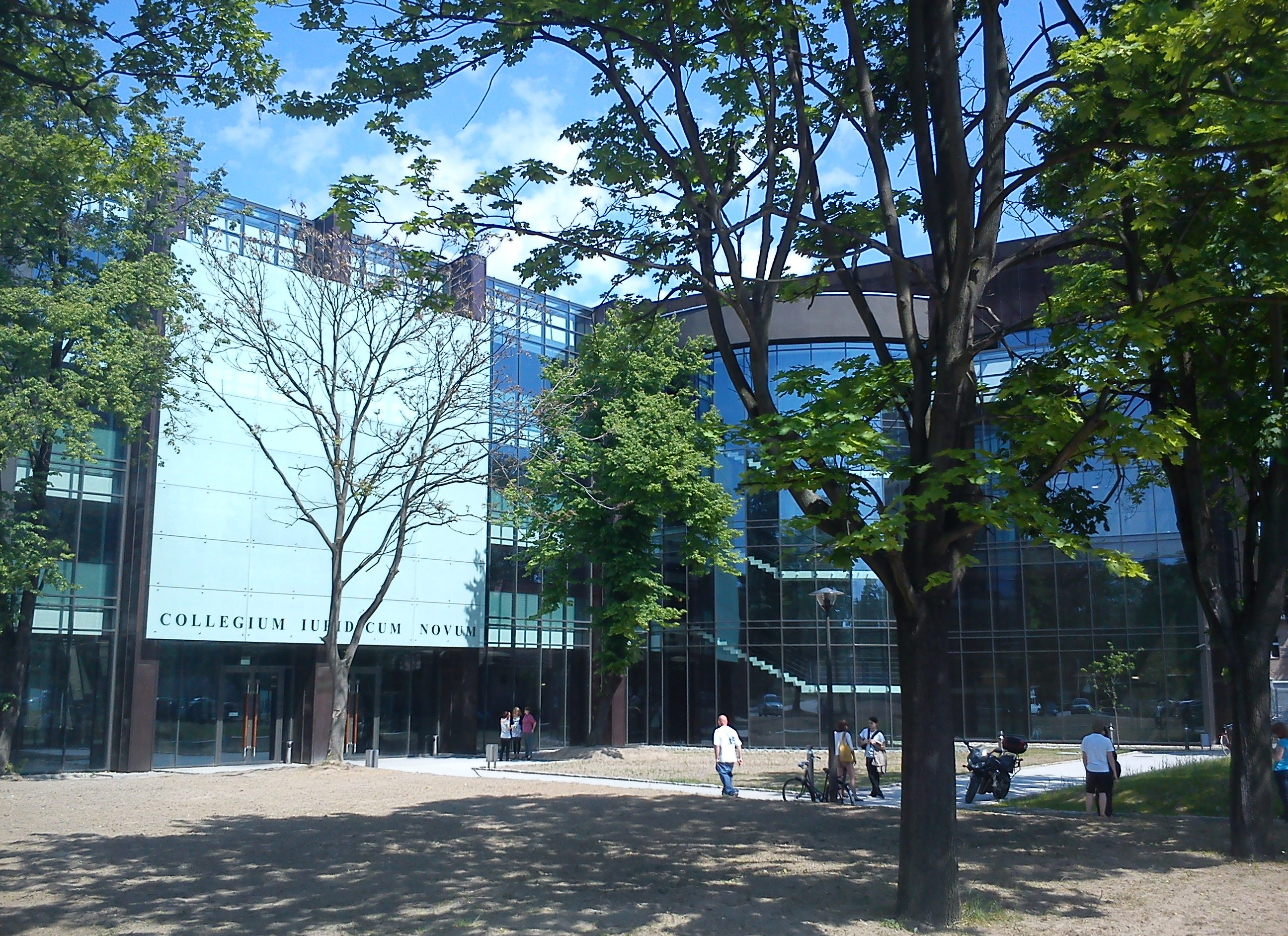
Collegium Iuridicum Novum – Faculty of Law and Administration
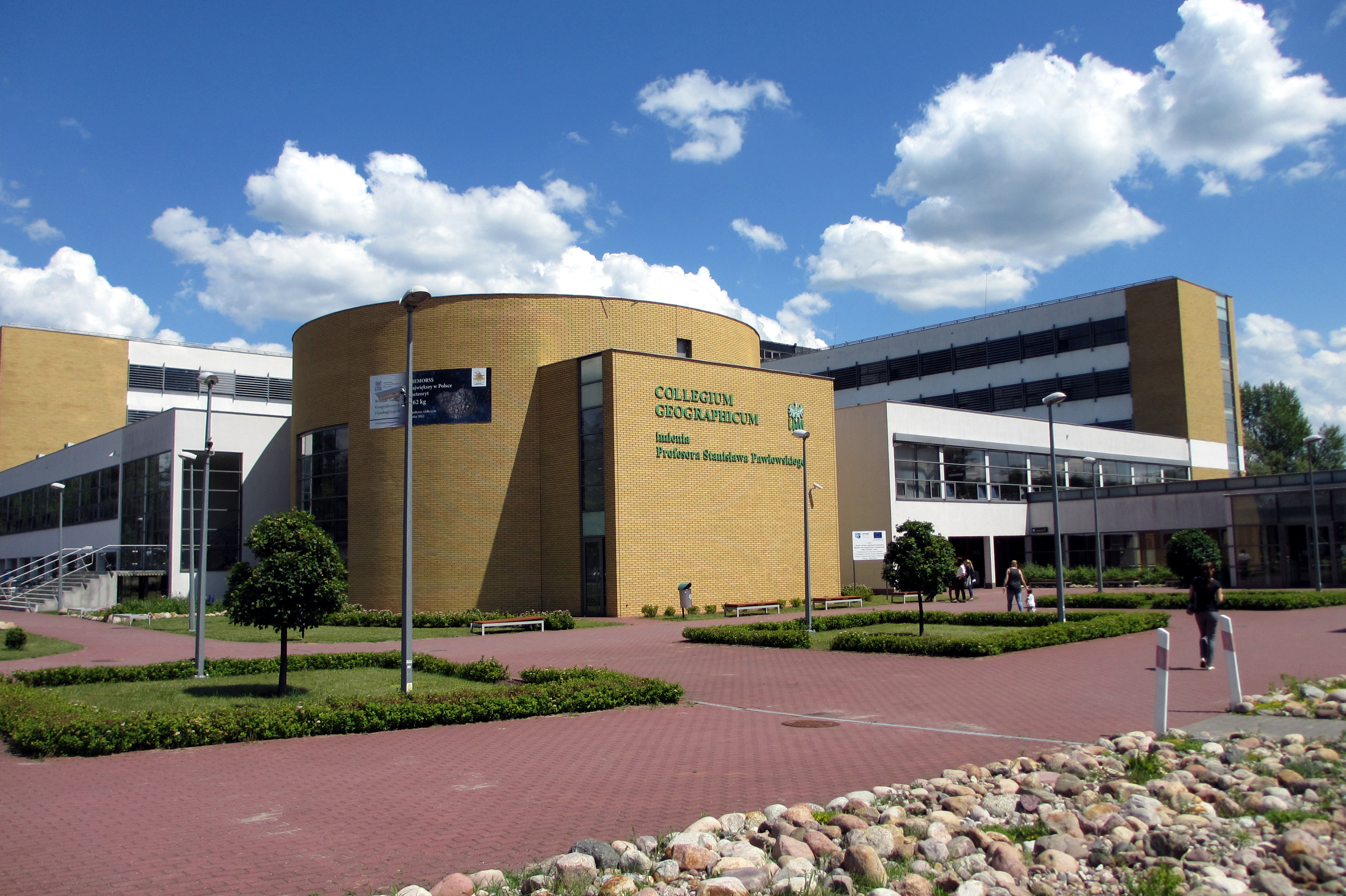
Faculty of Geographical and Geological Sciences

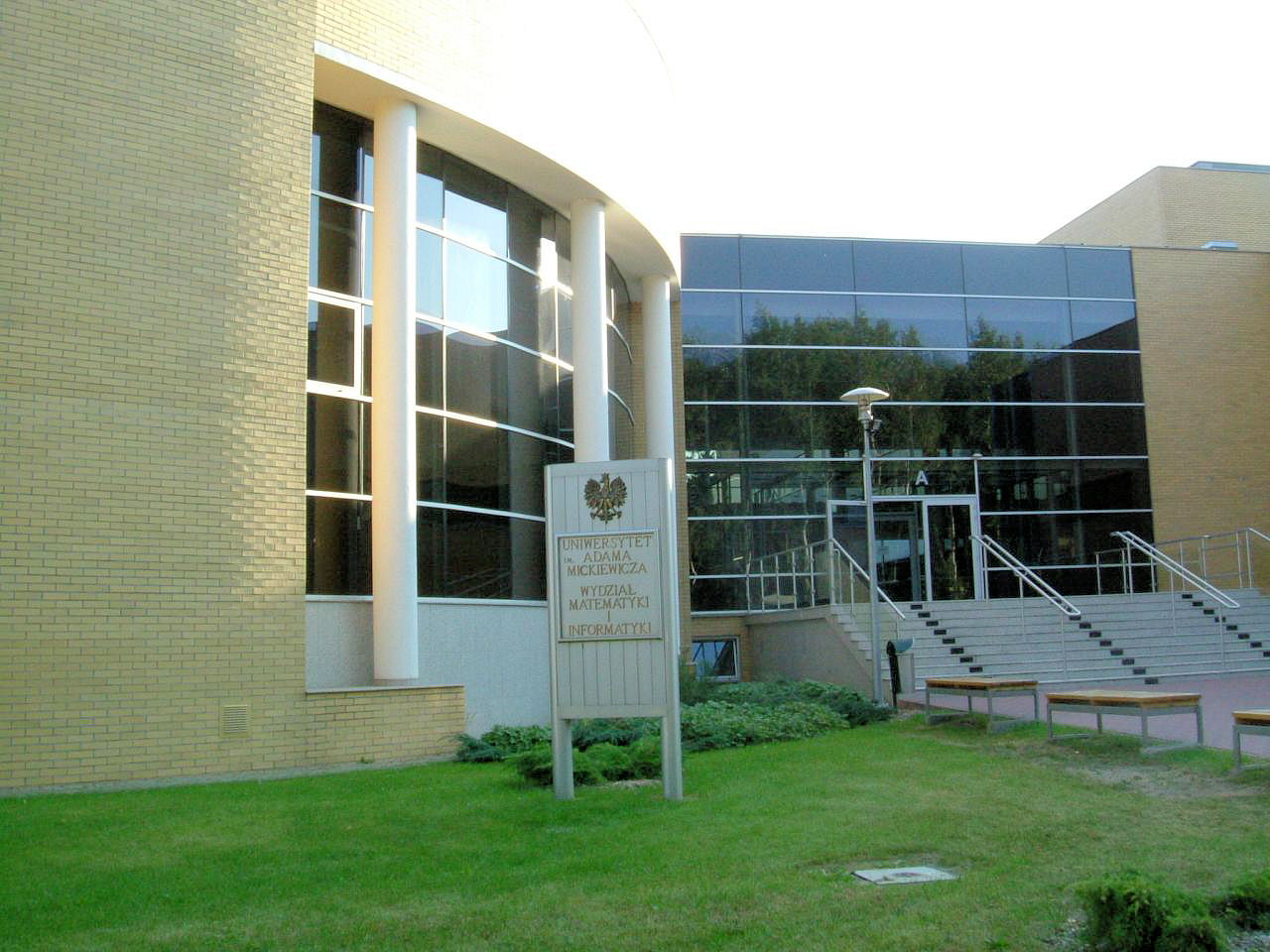
Faculty of Mathematics and Computer Science

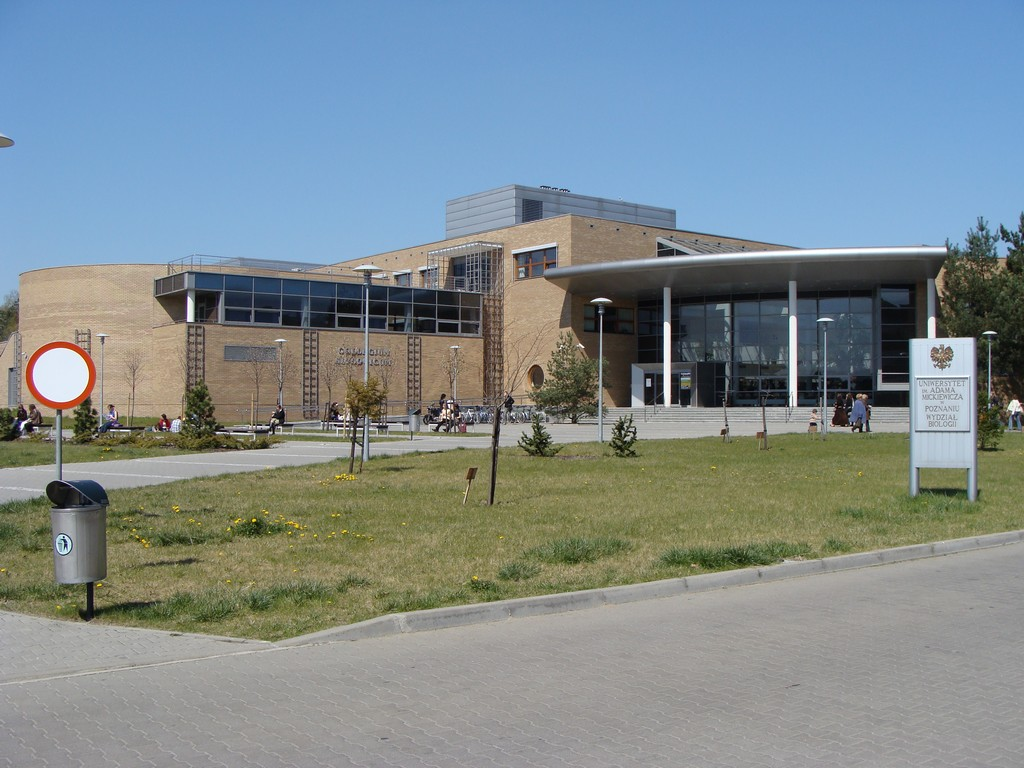
Faculty of Biology

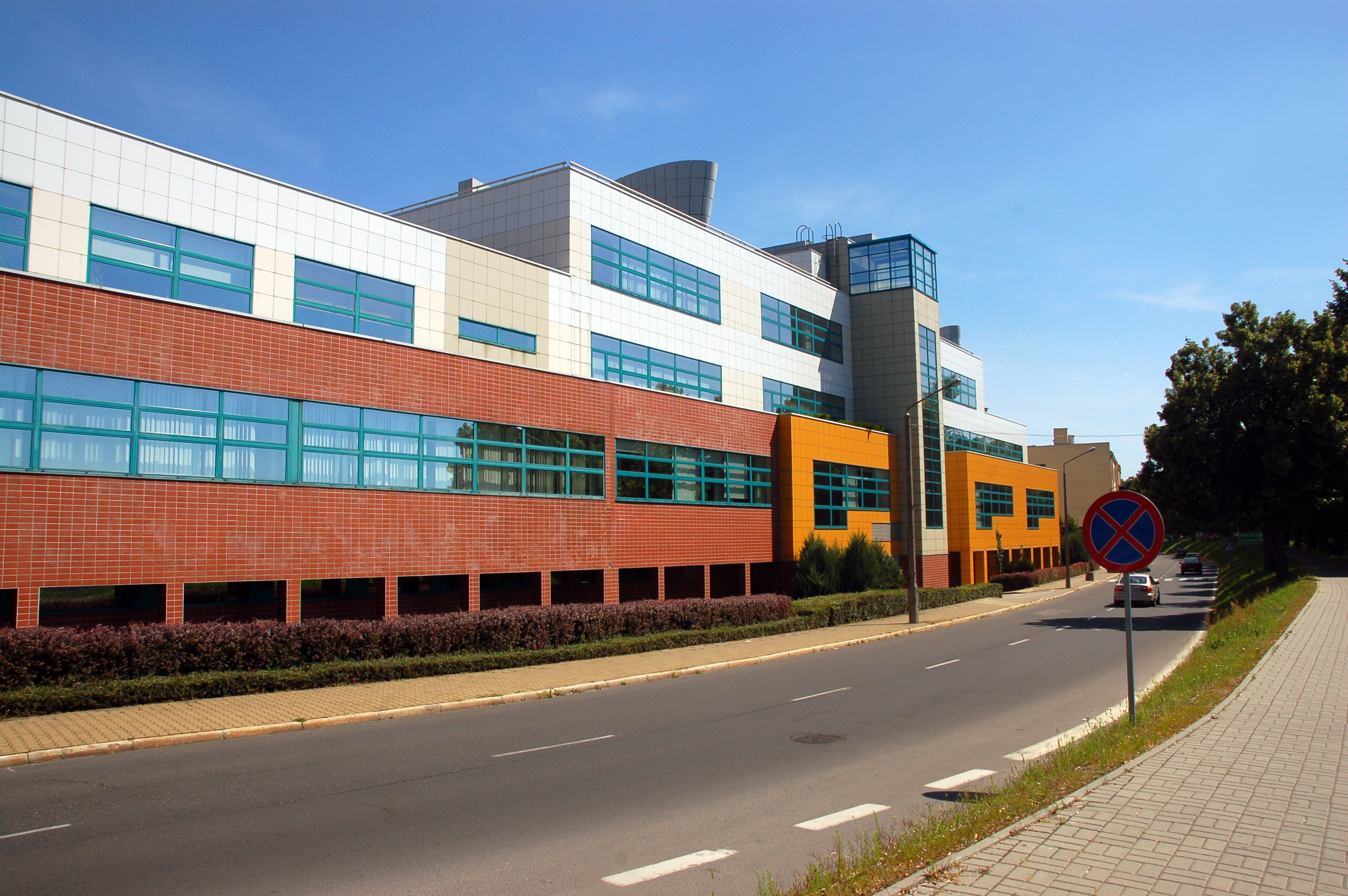
Collegium Polonicum in Słubice

== International cooperation ==
- Christian-Albrechts-Universität zu Kiel, Germany
- Otto-Friedrich-Universität Bamberg, Germany
- University of Greifswald, Germany
- Universität Wien, Austria
- Masaryk University, Brno, Czech Republic
- Université Libre de Bruxelles, Belgium
- University of Rennes 2 – Upper Brittany, France
- Universidad Complutense de Madrid, Spain
- Indiana University of Pennsylvania, Pennsylvania, US
- Cornell University Ithaca, New York, US
- Università degli Studi di Udine, Italy
- Università degli Studi di Urbino, Italy
- Sabancı University, Istanbul, Turkey
- Universidade de Aveiro, Portugal
- University of Agder, Norway
- Doğuş University, Istanbul, Turkey
- Anadolu University, Eskişehir, Turkey
- Balıkesir University, Balıkesir, Turkey
- Çukurova University, Adana, Turkey

== See also ==
- Open access in Poland
- List of modern universities in Europe (1801–1945)
