= Czesław Znamierowski =

Polish philosopher, jurist, and sociologist

- Born: Czesław Gabriel Stanisław Znamierowski; 8 May 1888; Warsaw, Poland
- Died: 26 September 1967 (aged 79); Poznań, Poland
- Citizenship: Polish
- Education: University of Basel (DPhil, 1911); University of Poznań (LLD, 1922)
- Known for: social ontology
- Scientific career
- Fields: law, philosophy of law, sociology
- Workplaces: University of Poznań (1919–1960)
- Thesis: Der Wahrheitsbegriff im Pragmatismus (On the Concept of Truth in Pragmatism) (1911)
- Doctoral students: Zygmunt Ziembiński

Czesław Znamierowski (1888–1967) was a Polish philosopher, jurist and sociologist. He was Professor of Jurisprudence at the University of Poznań and chaired its Department of Legal Theory and Philosophy of Law. Znamierowski is noted in Polish law for his contributions to social sciences (social ontology) and jurisprudence, particularly the concept of legal system which is similar to H.L.A. Hart's ideas, but was published almost forty years before Hart's The Concept of Law.

== Academic career ==
After passing his final exams in Yelatma's high school, Znamierowski studied philosophy, mathematics and physics at Leipzig University, where he was also attending Wilhelm Wundt's lectures. Between 1906 and 1907, he studied philosophy and history at the Saint Petersburg State University. In 1909, Znamierowski started psychology studies under the supervision of Carl Stumpf at the Friedrich Wilhelm University of Berlin and continued his philosophical studies under the supervision of Hans Cornelius at the Ludwig-Maximilians-Universität München.

In 1911, he obtained his Doctor of Philosophy (DPhil) degree in philosophy at the University of Basel, after completing a dissertation titled Der Wahrheitsbegriff im Pragmatismus (English: On the Concept of Truth in Pragmatism). Between 1912 and 1919 Znamierowski worked as a teacher in Warsaw's gymnasiums. In 1919, he graduated in law from University of Poznań's Faculty of Law, and in 1922 completed his Doctor of Law (LLD) thesis under the supervision of Antoni Peretiatkowicz, who introduced Znamierowski to the field of jurisprudence and convinced him to specialize in the subject. His doctoral thesis in law was critical of Leon Petrażycki's legal theory.

He was awarded his docent position in 1924, and the professor ordinarius title in 1934. Additionally, Znamierowski lectured at the University of Wrocław. During Second World War Znamierowski stayed at the Zamoyski family's palace in Kozłówka, where he was involved in underground education.

He was a member of the Warsaw Scientific Society, Poznań Society for the Advancement of Arts and Sciences, International Association for the Philosophy of Law and Social Philosophy (IVR) and in 1948, Znamierowski became a corresponding member of the Polish Academy of Learning.

In 1965, Adam Mickiewicz University awarded him with the honorary doctorate.

== Works ==
- Podstawowe pojęcia teorii prawa (Fundamental Concepts of Legal Theory), parts 1–2, 1924–30
- Elita a demokracja (Elite and Democracy; 1928)
- Prolegomena do nauki o państwie (Prolegomena to the Science of State; 1930)
- Zasady i kierunki etyki (Principles and Directions of Ethics);1957)
- Oceny i normy (Judgments and Norms; 1957).

== See also ==
- History of philosophy in Poland
- List of Poles

== Bibliography ==
- "Znamierowski, Czesław," Encyklopedia Powszechna PWN (PWN Universal Encyclopedia), Warsaw, Państwowe Wydawnictwo Naukowe, vol. 4, 1976, p. 798.
