= Adam Mickiewicz University Polar Station =

Polish research station in Svalbard, Norway

Coordinates: 78.6804°N 16.4545°E

- Adama Mickiewicza na Spitsbergenie Stacja Polarna "Petuniabukta"
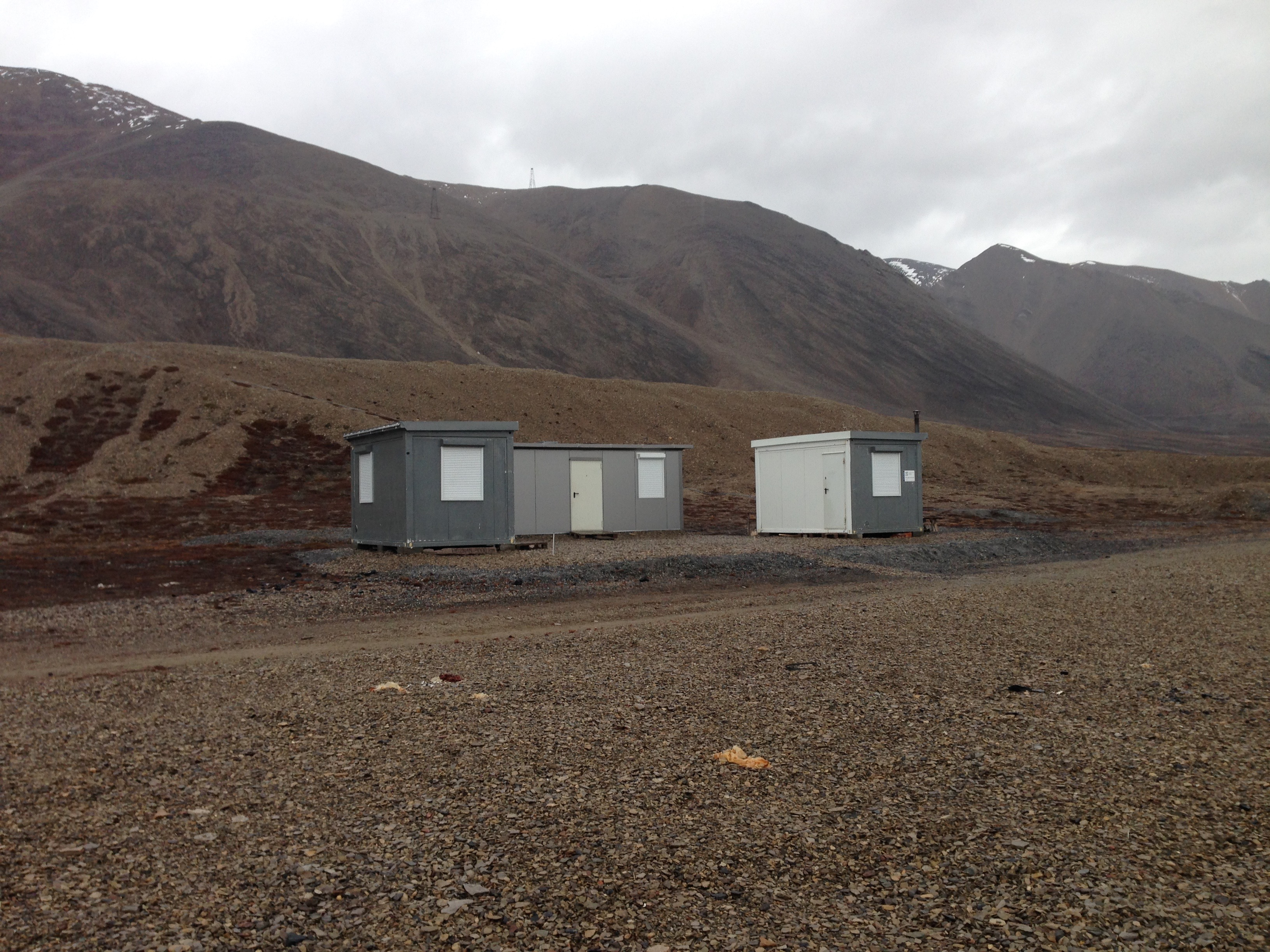
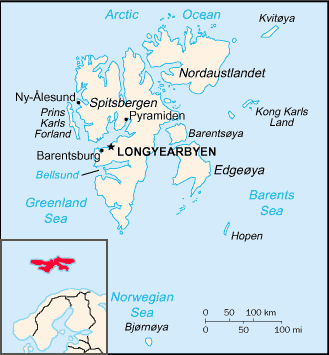
- Established: 1984
- Location: Petuniabukta, Svalbard, Norway
- Affiliations: Adam Mickiewicz University in Poznań

Polar Research Station "Petuniabukta", by Adam Mickiewicz University in Poznań, is a Polish seasonal polar research station located in the Petuniabukta (Petunia Bay), in the Northern part of Billefjord, and central part of Spitsbergen island in the Svalbard archipelago.

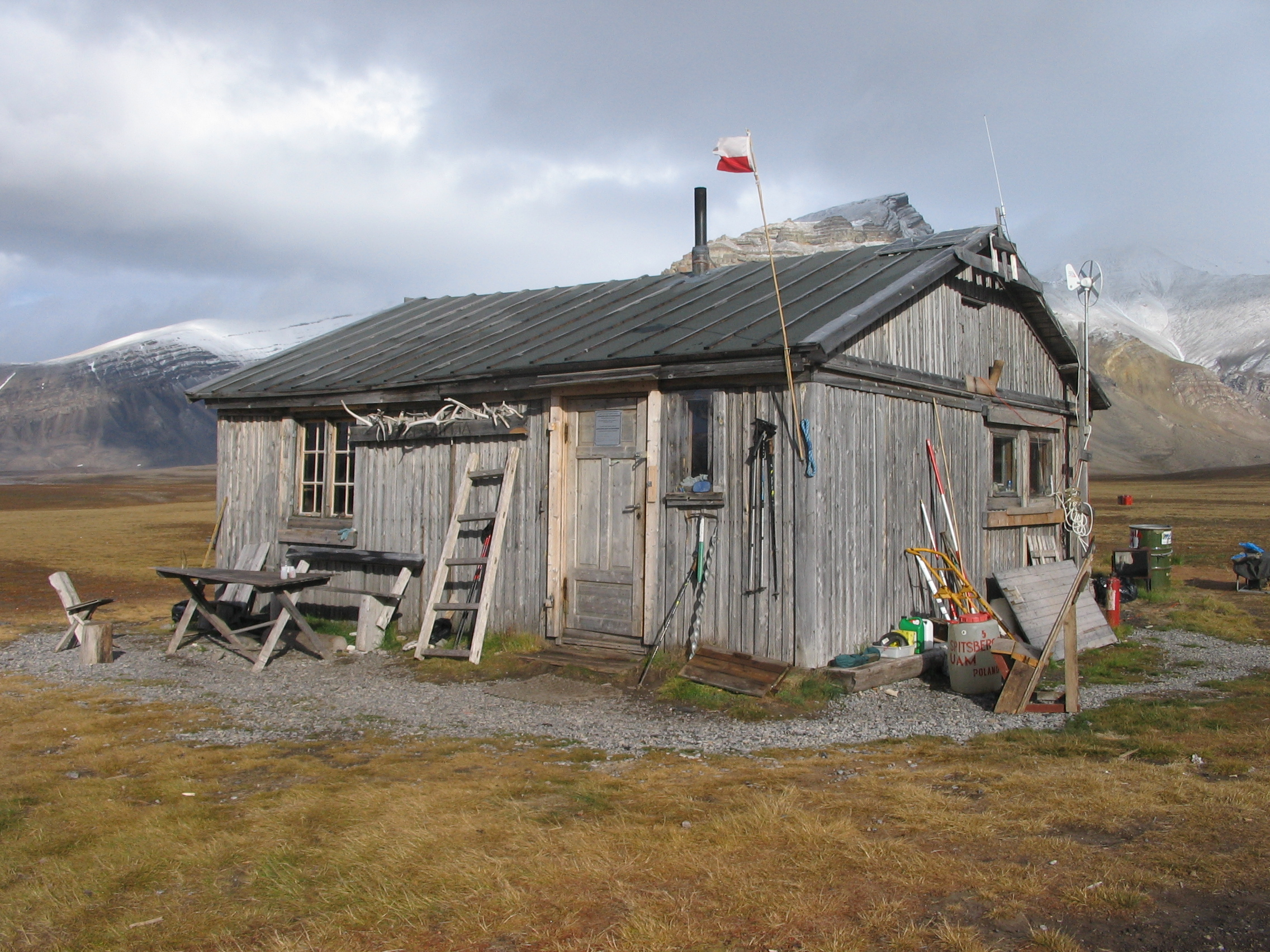
Skottehytta – venue of until 2009. Since then the station is located in container on opposite side of the bay.

The first expedition of the Adam Mickiewicz University at Spitsbergen took place in 1984. In the years 1984-1989, a research project focused on the research and creation of the Petuniabukta geomorphological map. In the 1990s, the research continued in the area of the Polish Polar Station Hornsund. In 2000, a new cycle of research was launched in the Gulf of Petunia.Until 2009, the University used the Skottehytt trapper hut, located on the eastern shores of the Bay of Petunia. After 2009, many efforts were made to build their own polar station. Finally, negotiations with the Norwegian authorities ended with a temporary agreement for the construction of two houses with an area of 10 m2 each. On 8 July 2011, the Polish ship MS Horyzont II, transporting elements of the new Poznań station, reached the Petunia Bay. The construction of the station was carried out by the crew of the 16th Polar Expedition UAM. The construction started on July 9, and ended on July 25, 2011. In the summer season 2015, during the 20th anniversary of the 20th Polar Expedition UAM, the station was moved to the west coast of Petunia Bay. At the same time, through the construction of another house, its usable space has doubled.
