= Ludwik Sitowski =

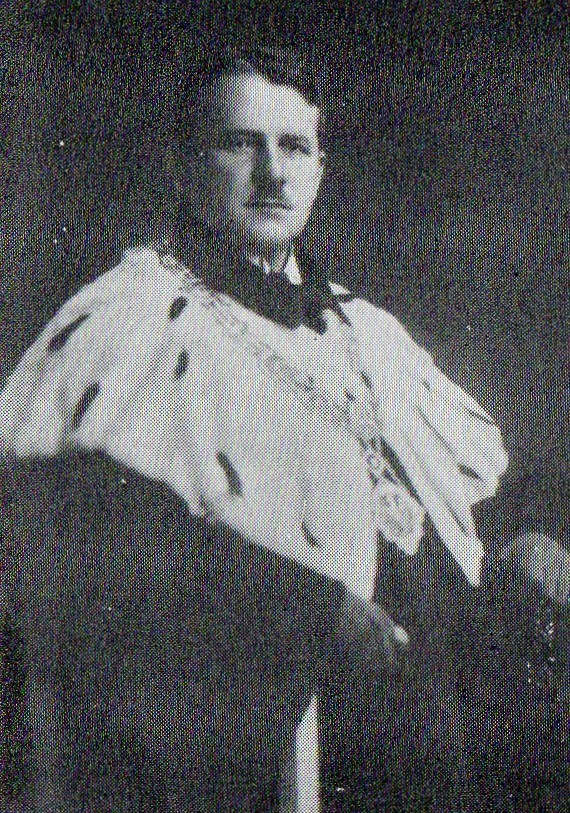
Prof. Ludwik Sitowski

Ludwik Sitowski (born 1880 - 1947) was a Polish zoologist. In 1925-1926 he was rector of the University of Poznań during an economic crisis.

Of his notable works, On the Inheritance of Aniline Dye is amongst them and was published on 3 September 1909.
