= Edward Feliks Lubicz-Niezabitowski =

Polish zoologist and physician

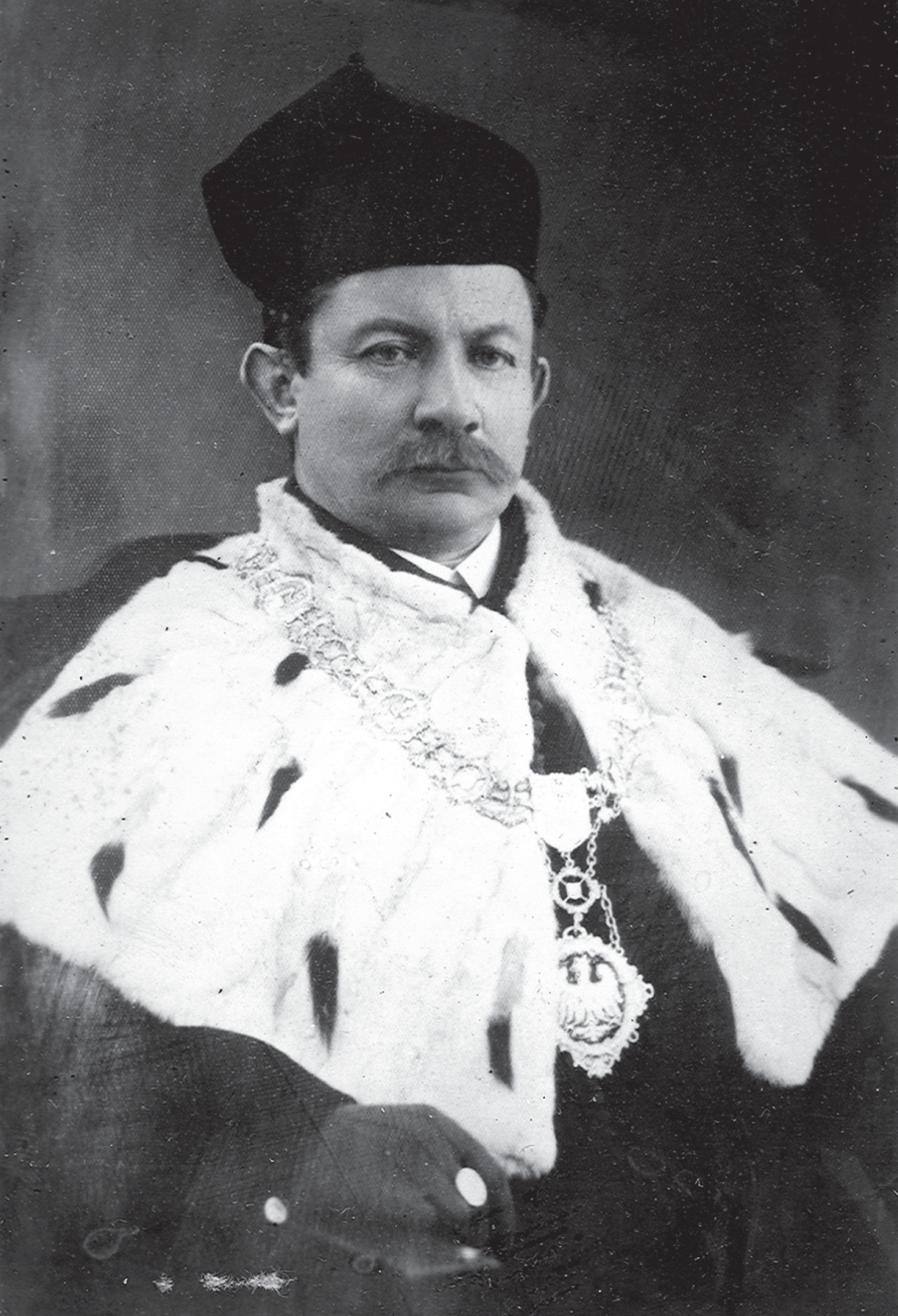
As rector in 1928-29

Edward Feliks Lubicz-Niezabitowski (30 May 1875 – 5 November 1946) was a Polish zoologist and physician. He took a special interest in the Pleistocene and Holocene fauna of the region. He served as a professor at the University of Poznań from 1921 and as rector in 1928–29.

== Life and work ==
Lubicz-Niezabitowski was born in Bugaj near Miłosław to Hieronim Michał and Władysława Ogończyk née Dąbrowska. His father had settled in Bugaj in the countryside after the failed January Uprising of September 1864. He was taught at home by an older sister. At the age of seven he went shooting birds along with his father and brothers. He also collected fossils and snails. In 1885 theirs along with 4000 families were expelled and they moved to Krakow. Here he often visited the Franciscan Monastery which held specimens of natural history. After studies at Przemyśl, he joined the medical school of the Jagiellonian University in 1894 and received his medical degree in 1900. During his student days he assisted Władysław Kulczyński and Konstanty Jelski organize specimens in the museum. He worked as an assistant in the department of comparative anatomy and then at the department of botany. He qualified as a teacher in 1903 and went to a junior high school in Nowy Targ in 1905. He married Leontyna daughter of entomologist Fryderyk Schiller of Rytro in 1903. Here he set up a medical practice as well and in his spare time collected specimens from around the region including summer holidays at Montemaggiore in Istria. These collections were deposited at the University of Poznań. He learned photography from Gauss von Garada and began to document fossils at digs. He also collaborated with Marian Łomnicki on the Staruń excavations and spent some time at the marine biology station in Naples. During World War I, he headed a reserve hospital at Nowy Targ. He joined the faculty of medicine at the Jagiellonian University in 1920 on an invitation from Heliodor Święcicki (1854-1923) but there was some confusion in the posting which clashed with that of Jan Kazimierz Wilczyński. The next year he became a full professor of anatomy and histology at the University of Poznań. Here he established a museum but many of the collections were destroyed in 1939 during World War II.

Lubicz-Niezabitowski took an interest in the Braconidae and described several new species. He collected fossil vertebrates extensively and published a key to the identification from remains.

Hippolyte niezabitowskii d'Udekem d'Acoz, 1996, a crustacean belonging to a genus formerly studied by Niezabitowski, and Ankothrips niezabitowskii (Schille, 1911), a species of thrips, were named in his honour.
