= Bogumił Brzezinski =

Polish chemist

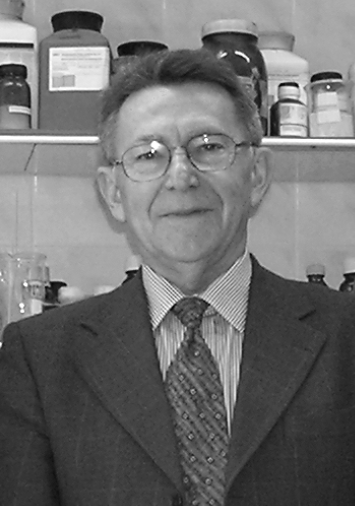
- Bogumił Brzezinski
- Born: 22 May 1943 (age 83)
- Education: Adam Mickiewicz University
- Scientific career
- Fields: physical chemistry
- Workplaces: Adam Mickiewicz University

Bogumił Kazimierz Brzezinski (born 22 May 1943) is a Polish chemist, professor of chemistry science who specialises in the field of infrared spectroscopy and hydrogen bonds. Co-worker of Prof. Georg Zundel. He is co-author of nearly 400 original scientific publications.

== Career ==
In 1967, he graduated from the Faculty of Mathematics, Physics and Chemistry at the Adam Mickiewicz University in Poznań with M.Sc. degree. Brzezinski defended his Ph.D. in 1972 and D. Sc. in 1982. He is a professor since 1991. He was Vice-Dean of the Faculty of Chemistry UAM in the years 1990–1996. Currently, Brzezinski is the head of the Department of Biochemistry since 1998. In the years 1975–1977, Brzezinski was Alexander von Humboldt Fellow at the Faculty of Biophysic of LMU Munich in Germany. Many times he was visiting Professor at the Faculty of Biophysic Charite of the Humboldt University of Berlin.

== Research areas ==
- Biochemistry, bioorganic and organic chemistry.
- Ionophores (monensin, lasalocid), their structures, antibacterial activity and chemical modifications.
- Ion channels, proton pumping - chemical modification, mechanism and biological activity, collective hydrogen bonds and bonds with monovalent metal cations.
- Gossypol and its derivatives - syntheses, spectroscopic investigations and biological tests.
- New compounds important in agriculture and medicine.
- Acid–base reactions - the role of arginine in biological systems.
- Chemistry of proton sponges.
