= Tomasz Jasiński (historian) =

Polish historian (born 1951)

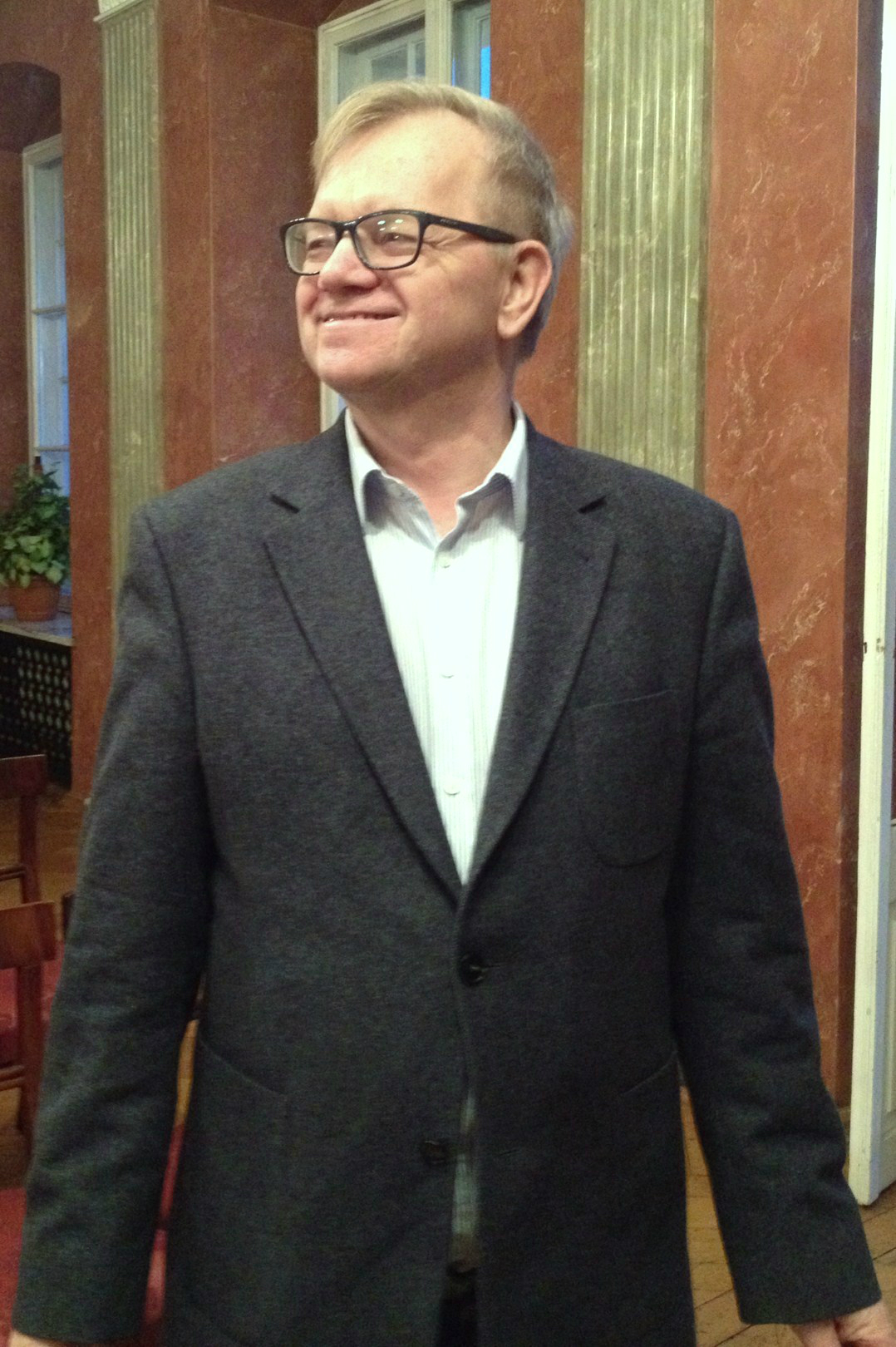
- Tomasz Jasiński
- Born: 25 September 1951; Robakowo
- Citizenship: Polish
- Education: Nicolaus Copernicus University in Toruń
- Occupations: medievalist, academic teacher
- Employer: Adam Mickiewicz University in Poznań

Tomasz Jasiński (born 1951) is a Polish historian, dean of the History Department at the Adam Mickiewicz University in Poznań. He specializes in medieval history of Poland.

Son of Kazimierz Jasiński, a Polish historian and medievalist.

== Publications ==
- Pierwsze lokacje miast nad Wisłą. 750 lat Torunia i Chełmna, Toruń 1980.
- Przedmieścia średniowiecznego Torunia i Chełmna, Poznań 1982.
- Przerwany hejnał, Kraków 1988.
- Kodeks dyplomatyczny Wielkopolski, t. VIII-XI: documents from years 1416-1444 (t. VIII-X with Antoni Gąsiorowski, t. XI with Antoni Gąsiorowski, Tomasz Jurek and Izabela Skierska), Warszawa - Poznań 1989 - 1999.
- Tabliczki woskowe w kancelariach miast Pomorza Nadwiślańskiego, Poznań 1991.
- Najstarsze kroniki i roczniki krzyżackie dotyczące Prus, Poznań 1996.
- Βδέλυγμα της έρημώσεως. Über die Anfänge des Neuen Testaments, Poznań 1998.
- O pochodzeniu Galla Anonima, Kraków 2008.
- Kruschwitz, Rimini und die Grundlagen des preußischen Ordenslandes. Urkundenstudien zur Frühzeit des Deutschen Ordens im Ostseeraum, Marburg 2008.
- Kronika Polska Galla Anonima w świetle unikatowej analizy komputerowej nowej generacji, Poznań 2011.
- The Slavs’ Ancestral Homeland, Poznań 2021.

== Awards ==
- Officer's Cross of Polonia Restituta (2019)
