= Zygmunt Tobolewski =

Polich lichenologist (1927–1988)

- Born: 29 January 1927; Grodzisk Wielkopolski
- Died: 16 August 1988 (aged 61); Poznań
- Education: University of Poznań
- Scientific career
- Fields: Lichenology
- Workplaces: Adam Mickiewicz University in Poznań
- Author abbrev. (botany): Tobol.

Zygmunt Robert Tobolewski (29 January 1927, Grodzisk Wielkopolski – 16 August 1988, Poznań) was a distinguished Polish lichenologist and professor at the Adam Mickiewicz University in Poznań. He graduated from the Faculty of Mathematical and Biological Sciences at the University of Poznań in 1950, earned his Ph.D. in 1960, and became a full professor in 1982. Tobolewski made significant contributions to the study of Polish lichens, focusing on regions such as the Carpathian Mountains, the Sudetes, and the northwestern and northeastern parts of Poland. He served as the president of the Lichenological Section of the Polish Botanical Society and edited notable works like Lichenotheca Polonica and the Atlas of Geographical Distribution of Spore-Plants in Poland (Lichenes). His influential publications include The Family Caliciaceae (Lichenes) in Poland and Polish Lichens, co-authored with Janusz Stanisław Nowak. Tobolewski was respected for his profound knowledge, dedication to science, and his role in educating and mentoring a generation of lichenologists in Poland.

Between the years 1952 and 1959, Tobolewski compiled 250 issues (divided into 11 fascicles) of an exsiccata series (sets of dried and labelled herbarium specimens) titled Zielnik porostow Polski: Lichenotheca Polonica ("Herbarium of Polish Lichens: Lichenotheca Polonica").
