= University of the Western Lands =

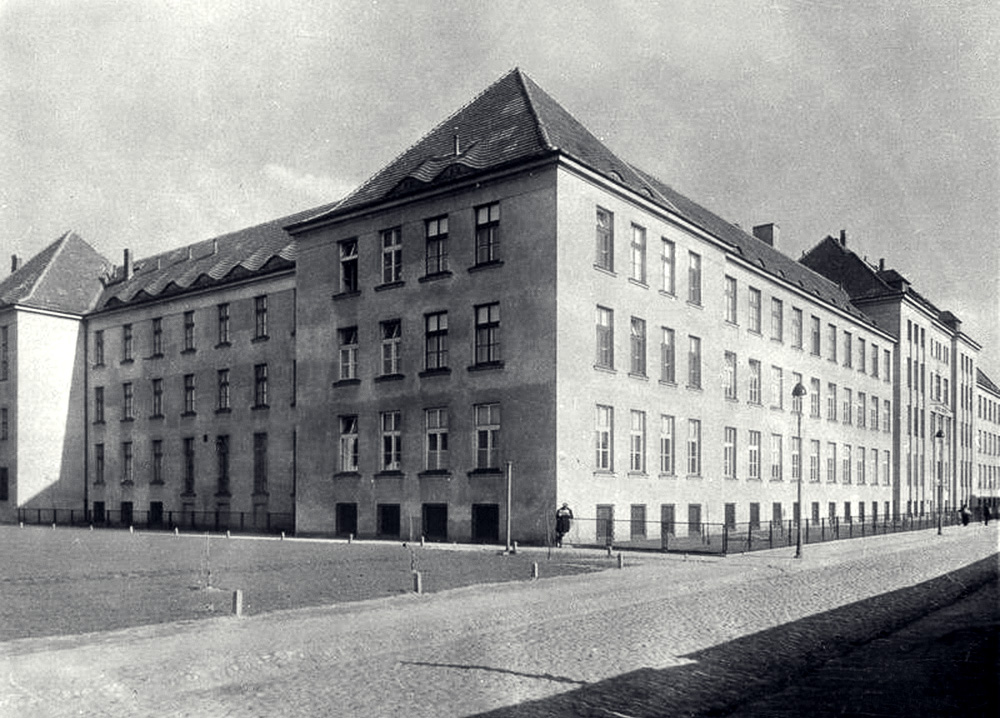
The former Wolski Hospital in Warsaw, one of the locations where the Medical Department of the University of the Western Lands operated

University of the Western Lands (Polish: Uniwersytet Ziem Zachodnich, UZZ, also translated as the University of the Western Area or University of the Western Territories) was an underground Polish university in occupied Poland during World War II. The faculty was composed mostly of the professors of Adam Mickiewicz University of Poznań who had been expelled by the Nazis, and included 17 different units, among them the faculty of medicine and surgery. It operated primarily in Warsaw from 1940 to 1944 and had branches in Kielce, Jędrzejów, Częstochowa and Milanówek.

== History and operations ==
University of the Western Lands was established in October 1940 as an initiative of the Department of Education of the Polish Underground State. Among those involved in its establishment were Maksymilian Rode, Ludwik Jaksa Bykowski, Władysław Kowalenko, Roman Pollak (first dean of the humanist department), and Witold Sawicki. Other notable faculty included Józef Rafacz (first dean of the law department), Roman Rybarski, Władysław Kowalski (dean of the theology department), Bronisław Koskowski (dean of the pharmaceutical department), and Adam Wrzosek (dean of the medical department). Most of the faculty came from the Poznań University, transformed by the Nazis into a German-only institution after its Polish faculty was expelled. The university operated in Warsaw, and would cooperate with other underground Warsaw universities, native to the city.

Over time, the university would open 17 different units, including 6 departments. In 1942 and 1943 the university's humanistic and law departments were joined by the theology, medical, pharmaceutical, and forest/agriculture departments, and the Sea Institute. The pharmaceutical department during that period had 215 students. By mid-1944, the humanistic department had 32 lectures and 168 students. The medical department, created in the 1942/1943 year, was one of the largest, with 610 students and 95 lecturers in the 1943/1944 year. The theology department had only 5 lecturers and 20 students. The law department was the most popular; the year 1943/1944 had over 600 listeners. This department awarded 54 master and one doctoral degree. Overall, in the 1943/1944 year, the university had about 1,200 students. In the 1943/1944 the University opened its first branches outside Warsaw, in Częstochowa and Kielce. It would have some form of presence throughout most of the General Government, in Milanówek, Grodzisk Mazowiecki, Radomsko, Częstochowa, Kielce, Jędrzejów, Ostrowiec Świętokrzyski and Kraków. Throughout its period of operations it awarded 95 master's degrees, 5 doctoral and 5 habilitations. Plans to create new departments were rendered obsolete by the chaos of the Warsaw Uprising. An underground Lawyer Club was also created, holding active presentations and discussions.

The university functioned until the Warsaw Uprising begun of August 1944. Many students of the University took part in the Uprising. About half of the faculty perished in the ensuing fighting, with the city itself reduced to rubble. After the defeat of the Uprising, the University functioned in a very limited format in the period 1944–1945 outside Warsaw. With the end of the war, the city of Poznań was restored to Poland, resuming its activities. Adam Mickiewicz University of Poznań sees the activities of the University of the Western Lands as a period of its wartime history.

During its brief history, the university had two rectors: Ludwik Jaxa-Bykowski (1940–1943) and Roman Pollak (1943–1945).
