= European University Continuing Education Network =

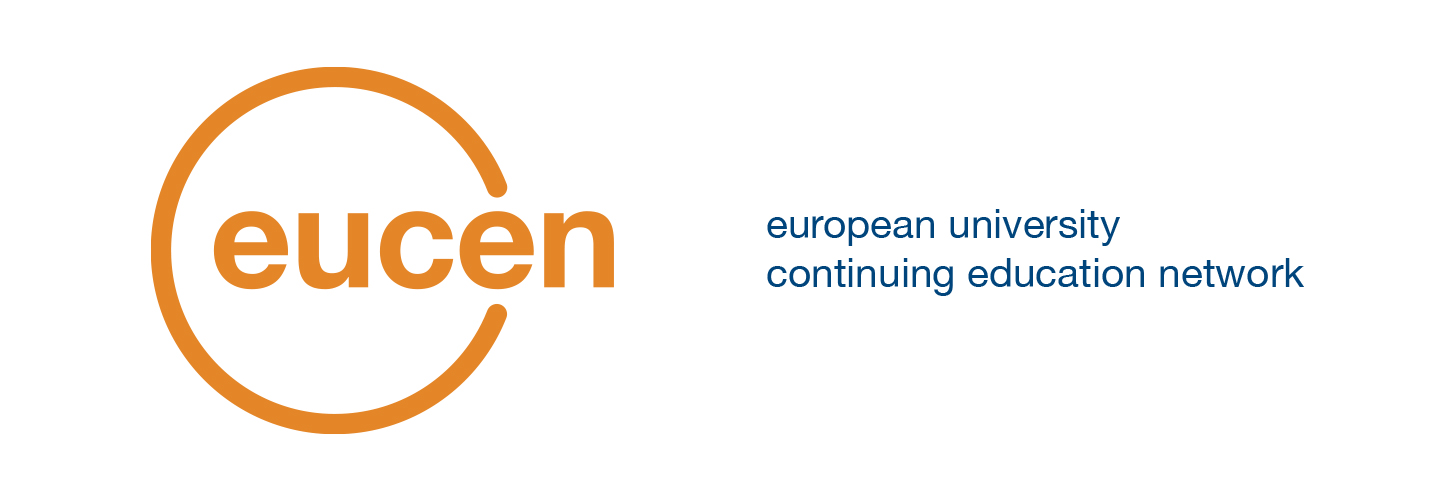

The European University Continuing Education Network (EUCEN) is a multidisciplinary European association for University-based continued education. It was created in May 1991 and registered in Belgium as a non-governmental, non-profit organization.

== History ==
In May 1991 the representatives of 15 European universities met in the University of Bristol (UK) to discuss the theme "Towards a European Universities Continuing Education Network". The represented universities were: Aalborg (DK), Aarhus (DK), Bordeaux (FR), Bristol (UK), Cambridge (UK), Exeter (UK), Galway (IE), Granada (ES), Hannover (DE), Leiden (NL), Liege (BE), Porto (PT), Oxford (UK), Pavia (IT) and Valladolid (ES). The participants at this initial meeting were invited to become the initial Full Members of eucen. The group decided that the main activities of eucen would be the exchange of information on strategies, regulations and techniques, establishing objectives and drawing up plans to meet them, enhancing international contacts, working towards setting standards of quality, agreeing routes to credit transfer and aiming at internationally recognised qualifications through Continuing Education. It was also agreed that an important role for eucen would be to inform policy makers and encourage them to decide on and set goals for Continuing Education development for the year 2000.

New members were accepted for first time in eucen's history at the General Assembly in Barcelona in May 1993. From that date, the number of partners and countries involved progressively increased. eucen decided to have two conferences per year and started developing important European projects (for example, TheNUCE).

In May 2000, the Association made a radical change in its organization, appointing professional staff and establishing the eucen's Secretariat in Barcelona (ES). In the following years, eucen evolved from being a volunteering network into becoming a wide European multidisciplinary network trying to bring consistency to the concept of University Lifelong Learning.

2004's Professions, Competence And Informal Learning wrote that as an organization eucen was "especially prolific in publication terms" and that their conference papers were particularly useful as review on European issues of continuing education, concluding that eucen had "opened up the European professional development research community to news of the rapid changes in the field arising from the deep-seated political, social, economic and educational transformations of these former Communist countries in the past 15 years." By 2009, eucen had representative organizations and universities from around 40 countries.

In 2020, eucen initiated UniLab, a project co-funded by the Erasmus+ Programme under KA2 – Capacity Building in Higher Education aimed at updating study programmes in Russia, Belorussia and Azerbaijan by incorporating modern competencies and skills, expanding international cooperation between universities and business and improving the international career centres in the Higher Education Institutions (HEIs) of these countries.
