= Antoni Peretiatkowicz =

Polish legal scholar (1884–1956)

His Magnificence Antoni Peretiatkowicz
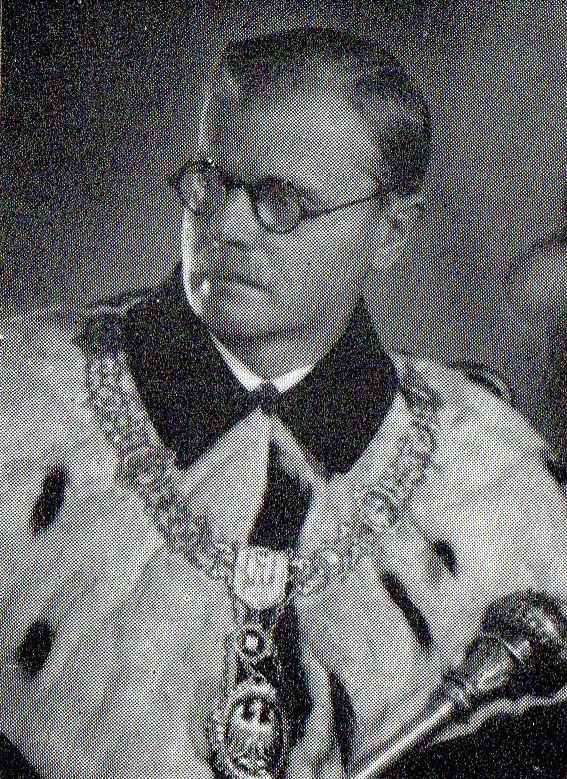
- Born: 13 June 1884; Boruchowo, Volyn
- Died: 18 December 1956 (aged 72); Poznań
- Spouse: Oleńka Łebińska
- Children: Elżbieta, Erazm

Academic background
- Education: Jagiellonian University
- Thesis: The legal aspect of Jean-Jacques Rousseau’s philosophy (1914)

Academic work
- Discipline: Law, Philosophy of law
- Institutions: University of Poznań
- Influenced: Georg Jellinek

Antoni Peretiatkowicz (1884-1956) was a Polish legal scholar, considered one of the most prominent legal jurists of twentieth century Poland.

== Studies ==
Peretiatkowicz began law studies in Warsaw in 1902 and continued in Berlin, Lviv (Lwów), and Cracow (Kraków). He received a doctorate degree from the Jagiellonian University in Cracow in 1909. From 1909 to 1914, Peretiatkowicz continued his post-doctoral studies in Paris, Geneva, and Heidelberg. Under the influence of Georg Jellinek, Peretiatkowicz came to a decision to concentrate on constitutional law and political doctrines as his main area of research.

As a student, Peretiatkowicz published his first legal and philosophical studies. In 1908, he received an award from the Gazeta Sądowa Warszawska (Warsaw Judicial Journal) for his article on legal philosophy and comparative methodology: Filozofia Prawa a Metoda Porównawcza (Legal Philosophy and Comparative Method). In the same year, Archiv für Rechts – und Wirtschaftsphilosophie published his article on Polish philosophy of the twentieth century: Die polnische Rechts und Wirtschaftsphilosophie im XX Jahrhundert.

In 1914, he wrote an insightful study on the legal aspect of Jean-Jacques Rousseau's philosophy (Filozofia Prawa J. J. Rousseau’a, Cracow, 1913). This was a new addition to a large body of studies that, until then, were mainly concerned with the political component of Rousseau's philosophy. This was one of his first studies on Rousseau's philosophy – a subject Peretiatkowicz continued to explore throughout his career. This publication was accepted by the Law Faculty of the Jagiellonian University as part of his habilitation procedure, and in 1914, Peretiatkowicz became a docent of legal philosophy at this university.

== Career ==
Postwar Poland's newly created universities needed experienced professors and scholars. In 1919, Peretiatkowicz accepted a call from the University of Poznań to organize, as a professor and dean, a new legal-economic faculty. Two years later he became the Vice-Rector of the university and finally its Rector between 1936 and 1939. From 1930, he was also a director of the private Higher School of Commerce until 1938. Thanks to his efforts, the school received the status of an official higher education institution in 1938, along with its new name as the State Academy of Commerce (currently Poznań University of Economics). Peretiatkowicz became its first Rector and remained in this position until the beginning of the Second World War in September 1939. As Rector of two higher education institutions—an unprecedented circumstance in Poland—Peretiatkowicz demonstrated outstanding organizational skills and leadership, while still writing and teaching classes.

In 1920, Peretiatkowicz founded a quarterly Ruch Prawniczy i Ekonomiczny (Legal and Economic Trends). As editor-in-chief, he oversaw the publication of twenty volumes. Many of his articles were included. Following the World War II, the periodical resumed its activity under the name of Ruch Prawniczy, Ekonomiczny i Socjalny (Legal, Economic, and Sociological Trends). In the same year, Peretiatkowicz instigated a publication of Encyklopedia Prawa Obowiązującego w Polsce (Encyclopedia of Polish Law). As editor-in-chief, he was responsible for five volumes between 1923 and 1926 and authored a chapter on Polish constitutional law. He authored the History of Political Doctrines of the Nineteenth and Twentieth Centuries, works on Hans Kelsen’s theory of law and state, and on the Fascist state. Some of his articles became part of a collective work Studia Prawnicze (Legal Studies, 1938). Peretiatkowicz has been considered one of the greatest authorities on J. J. Rousseau's philosophy.

In addition to scholarly work, Peretiatkowicz wrote several legal textbooks, published in numerous editions. For example, Wstęp do Nauk Prawnych (Introduction to Legal Sciences) had seven editions; Państwo Współczesne (Modern State), nine editions; as well as the numerous editions of annotated Polish Constitution of 1921 (Konstytucja Rzeczypospolitej Polskiej). His Podstawowe Pojęcia Prawa Administracyjnego (Basic Concepts of Administrative Law) was especially well liked among students, and Współczesna Encyklopedia Polityczna z Uwzględnieniem Życia Gospodarczego. Podręczny Informator Dla Czytelników Gazet (Modern Encyclopedia of Political Life Taking into Account the Economic Life. A Quick Reference for Newspaper Readers), conceived as a source of reference for layman readers, enjoyed three editions.

In 1936, Peretiatkowicz organized the Institute of Public Law. In 1937 he was nominated a member of the Jurisdictional Tribunal in Warsaw (Trybunał Kompetencyjny), and in 1939, one of the judges of the Highest Administrative Tribunal (Najwyższy Trybunał Administracyjny).

The new post-war regime seriously deprived Peretiatkowicz of academic freedom. His didactic work and research were hampered, and his publications censored and modified. He published very little, particularly in light of his prolific career during the interwar period. Peretiatkowicz died in Poznań, on 18 December 1956.
