= Petuniabukta =

Bay in Svalbard, Norway

Coordinates: 78.687°N 16.529°E

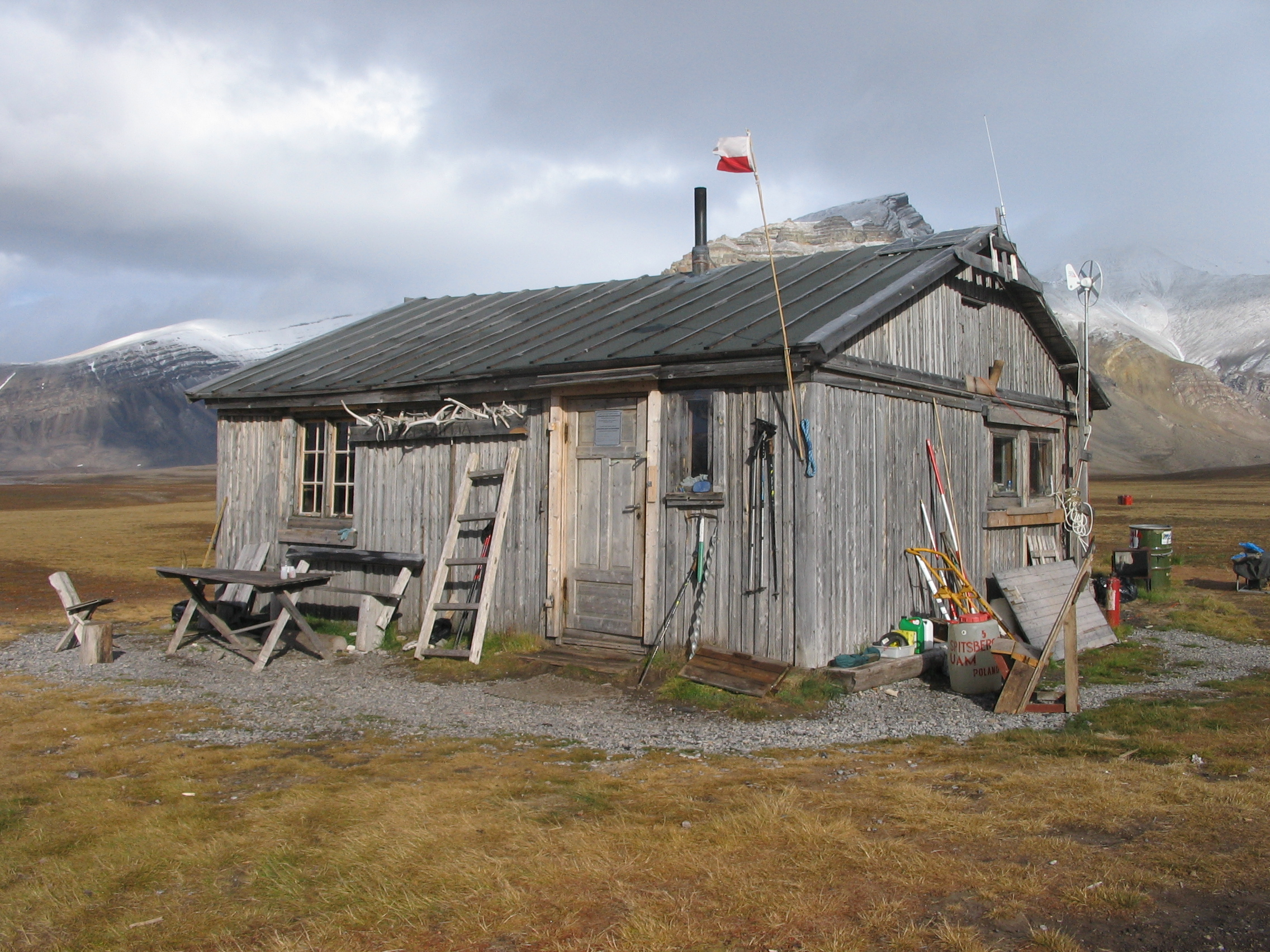
The cabin Skottehytta in Petuniabukta belongs to a Scottish company.

Petuniabukta is a bay in Dickson Land at Spitsbergen, Svalbard. It constitutes the northern branch of Billefjorden. The bay is named after the Scottish vessel SS Petunia. Northwest of the bay is the valley of Hørbyedalen and the glacier of Hørbyebreen.
