= 1947 in philosophy =

1947 in philosophy

== Events ==
- Colin Murray Turbayne completes his service as Chief of Staff for Australian Intelligence under General Douglas MacArthur during World War II and emigrates from Australia to the United States to pursue his graduate studies.

== Publications ==
- Alan Watts, Behold the Spirit (1947)
- Max Horkheimer and Theodor W. Adorno, Dialectic of Enlightenment (1947)
- Max Horkheimer, The Eclipse of Reason (1947)
- P. D. Ouspensky, In Search of the Miraculous (1947)
- Rudolf Carnap, Meaning and Necessity (1947)

== Births ==
- January 14 - Wlodek Rabinowicz
- January 24 - Susan Bordo
- February 7 - Peter Blokhuis
- February 20 - Philip Kitcher
- February 20 - Leonardo Moledo (died 2014)
- February 21 - Nanda Thein Zan (died 2011)
- February 22 - Frank Van Dun
- February 25 - Marc Sautet (died 1998)
- March 2 - Yuri Matiyasevich
- March 13 - Sayyid Al-Qemany
- March 26 - Subhash Kak
- March 27 - Daniel M. Hausman
- April 1 - Nadežda Čačinovič
- April 2 - Camille Paglia
- April 21 - Terence Irwin
- April 25 - Timo Airaksinen
- May 6 - Martha Nussbaum
- May 12 - Michael Ignatieff
- May 20 - Nancy Fraser
- May 29 - Goran Švob (died 2013)
- June 10 - Geydar Dzhemal (died 2016)
- June 19 - John Ralston Saul
- June 21 - Fernando Savater
- June 22 - Bruno Latour
- June 26 - Peter Sloterdijk
- July 6 - Michael Williams
- July 26 - Steven Tainer
- August 28 - Jens Staubrand
- September 8 - Rémi Brague
- September 10 - Karen J. Warren
- September 20 - Gillian Rose (died 1995)
- September 29 - Ülo Kaevats (died 2015)
- October 24 - Barbara Cassin
- November 7 - Günter Abel
- November 21 - David Gooding (died 2009)

=== Unspecified Birth Dates ===
- Gordon Anderson (unknown)
- Karl Ameriks (unknown)
- Thomas Baldwin (unknown)
- David Bell (unknown)
- Carmine Benincasa (unknown)
- John Broome (unknown)
- Noël Carroll (unknown)
- David Conway (unknown)
- Robert T. Craig (unknown)
- Jean Curthoys (unknown)
- Oliver Friggieri (unknown)
- James Heisig (unknown)
- Bensalem Himmich (unknown, born 1948?)
- Paul Horwich (unknown)
- Ole Fogh Kirkeby (unknown)
- Louise Lawler (unknown)
- David Loy (unknown)
- David Malament (unknown)
- Shkelzen Maliqi (unknown)
- Françoise Meltzer (unknown)
- Leonardo Moledo (unknown)
- Alun Munslow (unknown)
- David Papineau (unknown)
- Jean-Jacques Pelletier (unknown)
- Mark de Bretton Platts (unknown)
- Vince Riolo (unknown)
- Alan Soble (unknown)
- Alfred I. Tauber (unknown)
- Xu Youyu (unknown)

== Deaths ==
- January 12 - George Chatterton-Hill (born 1883)
- January 22 - Vivienne Haigh-Wood Eliot (born 1888)
- January 28 - Morris Raphael Cohen (born 1880)
- February 24 - Pierre Janet (born 1859)
- May 8 - Cassius Jackson Keyser (born 1862)
- June 11 - Richard Hönigswald (born 1875)
- July - Léon Robin (born 1866)
- July 19 - Max Dessoir (born 1867)
- July 20 - Swami Vipulananda (born 1892)
- September 9 - Ananda Coomaraswamy (born 1877)
- September 22 - Pierre Lecomte du Noüy (born 1883)
- September 27 - Hans Cornelius (born 1863)
- October 4 - Max Planck (born 1858)
- December 13 - Nicholas Roerich (born 1874)
- December 23 - Ziauddin Ahmad (born 1878)
- December 23 - Maurice De Wulf (born 1867)
- December 29 - Harold Arthur Prichard (burn 1871)
- December 30 - Alfred North Whitehead (born 1861)
- Marcel Foucault
- Konstanty Michalski
