= Vera Kovarsky =

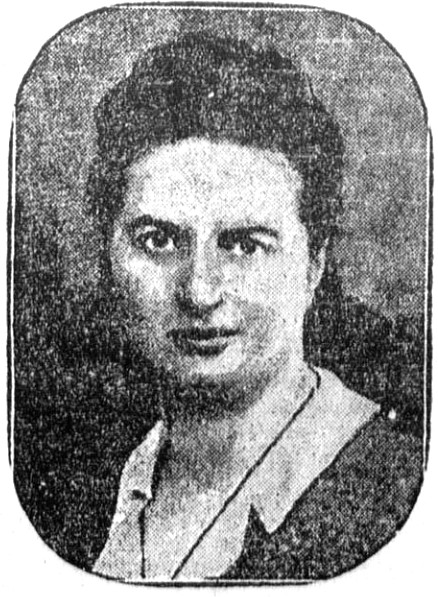
- Vera Kovarsky in 1928.
- Born: Vera Rebeka Emila Kovarsky; 4 February 1896; Daugavpils, Latvia
- Died: 13 October 1973 (aged 77); Montpellier, France
- Resting place: Montpellier Cemetery
- Education: University of Montpellier, Doctor of Medicine
- Known for: • Profil psychologique de M. le professeur Rossolimo, 1927. (Psychological Profile of Professor Rossolimo) • Charte des droits fondamentaux du gaucher, 1949. (Charter of Fundamental Rights for left-handed ).
- Scientific career
- Fields: Psychology

Vera Kovarsky (February 4, 1896 – October 13, 1973) was a French psychologist, specializing in educational guidance and left-handed children.

== Biography ==
Vera Kovarsky was born Vera Rebeka Emila Kovarsky in Daugavpils (then named Dvinsk), Latvia, on February 4, 1896 (February 16 in the Gregorian calendar). She was the daughter of Émile Kovarsky and Dina Schlepianoff, who were Jewish intellectuals.

She later left Latvia to study in France., and had settled in Montpellier in the 1920s, studying child psychology at the University of Montpellier under Marcel Foucault, a professor of linguistics and phonetics.

On July 6, 1927, she defended her doctoral thesis entitled: Profil psychologique de M. le professeur Rossolimo : méthode de mesure des capacités psychiques chez les enfants et les adultes, normaux et anormaux (Psychological Profile of Professor Rossolimo: Method for Measuring Psychic Capacities in Children and Adults, Normal and Abnormal)

The aim was to identify children with learning difficulties in order to guide them toward more suitable educational paths, using a series of tests described in detail. The following year, the thesis was published by Editions Alcan. The Journal des débats mentioned it on April 26, 1928, in its Science Review section, though it criticized the complexity of the method

She then encouraged the city of Montpellier to establish a psychological inspection service, which was a completely new initiative at the time. Journalist Jules Véran wrote in the newspaper L'Écho de Paris on 16 December 1930 :

On the initiative of Miss Kovarsky and based on her plans, the city of Montpellier appointed her as inspector-psychologist for its schools. This institution is a novelty in France, and even, in the way it is designed, in Europe and America.

She took on the role of psychological inspector, which would later evolve into that of school psychologist.

Articles about her published in Le Petit Méridional during the 1920s and 1930s described her as living in poverty:

Miss Vera Kovarsky, however, did not eat only white bread in our city. Even black bread was often rare for her. [...] The room where Miss Vera Kovarsky lives and works resembles a monastic cell. A narrow iron bed; furniture made of three planks, a table lit by a few photographs of scientists, limewashed walls.

In 1941, she was asked to cease all activity in municipal schools, in accordance with the Law on the status of Jews of October 30, 1940 She was only reinstated after the Liberation of France on April 20, 1945 , noted that the monthly amount she had been receiving before the war (in 1940, 1,065 FRF — equivalent to €501.90 in 2023) was not a salary but an allowance, and proposed on January 8, 1946 to raise it to 3,000 FRF (€290.40 in 2023) (which did not offset the inflation of that time). She later became head of the phoniatrics laboratory in the otorhinolaryngology department of Professor Terracol in Montpellier.

On 13 October 1973, she died unmarried at the age of 77 in Montpellier, the city she had made her home.

== The Rehabilitation of Left-Handers ==
As early as 1937, Vera Kovarsky presented a paper at the First International Congress of Child Psychiatry titled : Some Disorders of Intelligence and Character in Left-Handed Children, in which she argued that “left-handedness is no more correctable than right-handedness”

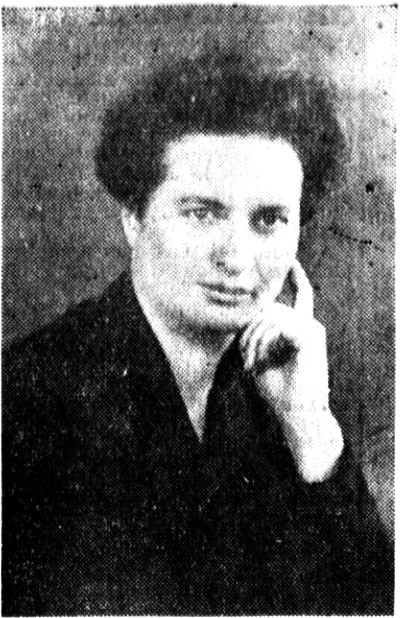
Vera Kovarsky in 1935.

In 1938, at the French Academy of Sciences, she stated that “forbidding a left-handed child from using their left hand always causes functional disorders that make them unsuited for school”.

She particularly linked this issue to stuttering in several articles, such as Contradicted Left-Handers and Phonopathies in 1948. She multiplied her efforts, addressing both public opinion and scientific institutions of her time. In 1949, she submitted a proposal to the Académie nationale de médecine for a Charter of Fundamental Rights for Left-Handers and later published Plea in Favor of Left-Handers in 1953.

However, the awareness campaign that Vera Kovarsky had led for over twenty years had little effect, at least not until the 1960s in France.

Sylvain Wagnon, professor of education sciences at the University of Montpellier, wrote in 2019:

For decades, she undertook a kind of "crusade " to raise awareness of the disorders experienced by contradicted left-handers, the links between verbal deafness and contradicted left-handedness, the links between stuttering and contradicted left-handedness, voice disorders, and the need to screen for left-handedness. She emphasized the necessity of psychological inspection in schools and defined the objectives of such an inspection.

== Works ==
=== Thesis, Books, and Articles ===
==== Psychology ====
- Le Profil psychologique de M. le professeur Rossolimo. Méthode de mesure des capacités psychiques chez les enfants et les adultes, normaux et anormaux (The Psychological Profile of Professor Rossolimo. Method for Measuring Psychic Capacities in Children and Adults, Normal and Abnormal), doctoral thesis, Montpellier, E. Montane Printing, 1927, 178 pages.
- La Mesure des capacités psychiques chez les enfants et les adultes, normaux et anormaux : La Méthode du profil psychologique (Measuring Psychic Capacities in Children and Adults, Normal and Abnormal: The Psychological Profile Method), Paris, Félix Alcan Bookstore, 1927, 178 pages.
- L'Inspection psychologique à Montpellier (Psychological Inspection in Montpellier), Éducation, Paris, February 1930.
- L’œuvre scientifique de Maurice Grammont (The Scientific Work of Maurice Grammont), Paris, Le François, 1949, 58 pages.
- Quelques signes morpho-psycho-physiologiques de la vraie gaucherie et de la gaucherie contrariée (Some Morpho-Psycho-Physiological Signs of True Left-Handedness and Contradicted Left-Handedness) (Excerpt from the “Proceedings of the 1st International Congress of Differential Anthropology,” September 11–16, 1950. Fascicle 5), 1950.
- Diététique et rééducation biopsychophoniatrique des bègues (Dietetics and Biopsychophoniatric Reeducation of Stutterers), Journal Français d’Oto-Rhino-Laryngologie, March 1952.
- Surdité verbale et gaucherie contrariée (Verbal Deafness and Contradicted Left-Handedness), Journal Français d’Oto-Rhino-Laryngologie, No. 2, February 1953.
- Plaidoyer en faveur des gauchers (Plea in Favor of Left-Handers), Toulouse Médical, June 1953.
- Cyanochromothérapie et rééducation biopsychophoniatrique des bègues (Cyanochromotherapy and Biopsychophoniatric Reeducation of Stutterers), Languedoc Médical, No. 1, January–February 1955.
- Levure de bière sèche, aliment de base au cours de la rééducation biopsychophoniatrique des bègues (Dry Brewer’s Yeast, a Staple Food During Biopsychophoniatric Reeducation of Stutterers), Languedoc Médical, No. 4, July–August 1955.
- La Musique linguistique : La Naissance de la voix. Utilisation de l'instrument vocal. Les Propriétés de la voix (Linguistic Music: The Birth of the Voice. Use of the Vocal Instrument. Properties of the Voice), Languedoc Médical, January–February 1956.

==== Literature ====
She authored a collection of prose poems titled:

- À Montpellier, soleil du Languedoc. Vibrer à l'unisson, poèmes en prose (In Montpellier, Sun of Languedoc. Vibrating in Unison, Prose Poems )
- À Palavas-les-Flots (In Palavas-les-Flots, Symphonic Poem of the Stormy Sea, Notes).
- Le Rire qui unit, esthétique vocale, études (The Laugh That Unites, Vocal Aesthetics, Studies) , Montpellier, Editions of the journal Souffles (printed by J. Reschly), 1953.

=== Translations ===
She translated from Russian the works of neurologist Grigory Ivanovich Rossolimo, whose method was the subject of her doctoral thesis at the Faculty of Montpellier.

=== Lectures ===
In 1931, she gave two lectures:

- In April : on Fyodor Dostoevsky
- In November : on English mysticism.
