= Janneke =

Dutch feminine given name

Janneke (Dutch pronunciation: [ˈjɑnəkə]) is a Dutch feminine given name, a diminutive short form of Johanna.

== People named Janneke ==
People with the given name Janneke include:

- Janneke Marlene van Bijsterveldt-Vliegenthart (born 1961), Dutch CDA politician
- Janneke Busser Kanis (born 1985), Dutch racing cyclist
- Janneke Ensing (born 1986), Dutch racing cyclist
- Janneke Jonkman (born 1978), Dutch writer
- Janneke Louisa (born 1965), Dutch civil servant and politician
- Janneke Parrish (born 1990 or 1991). Dutch-American workers' rights activist
- Janneke Raaijmakers (born 1973), Dutch medievalist historian
- Janneke Schopman (born 1977), Dutch field hockey player
- Janneke Snijder-Hazelhoff (born 1952), Dutch VVD politician
- Janneke van Asperen (fl. 2020s), Dutch art historian and museum curator
- Janneke van Tienen (born 1979), Dutch volleyball player
- Janneke Vos (born 1977), Dutch racing cyclist

Fictional

- Janneke, protagonist of the children's books series Jip and Janneke
