= History of ontology =

Study of the development of ontology

The history of ontology studies the development of theories of the nature and categories of being from the ancient period to the present.

== Ancient ==
=== Greek philosophy ===
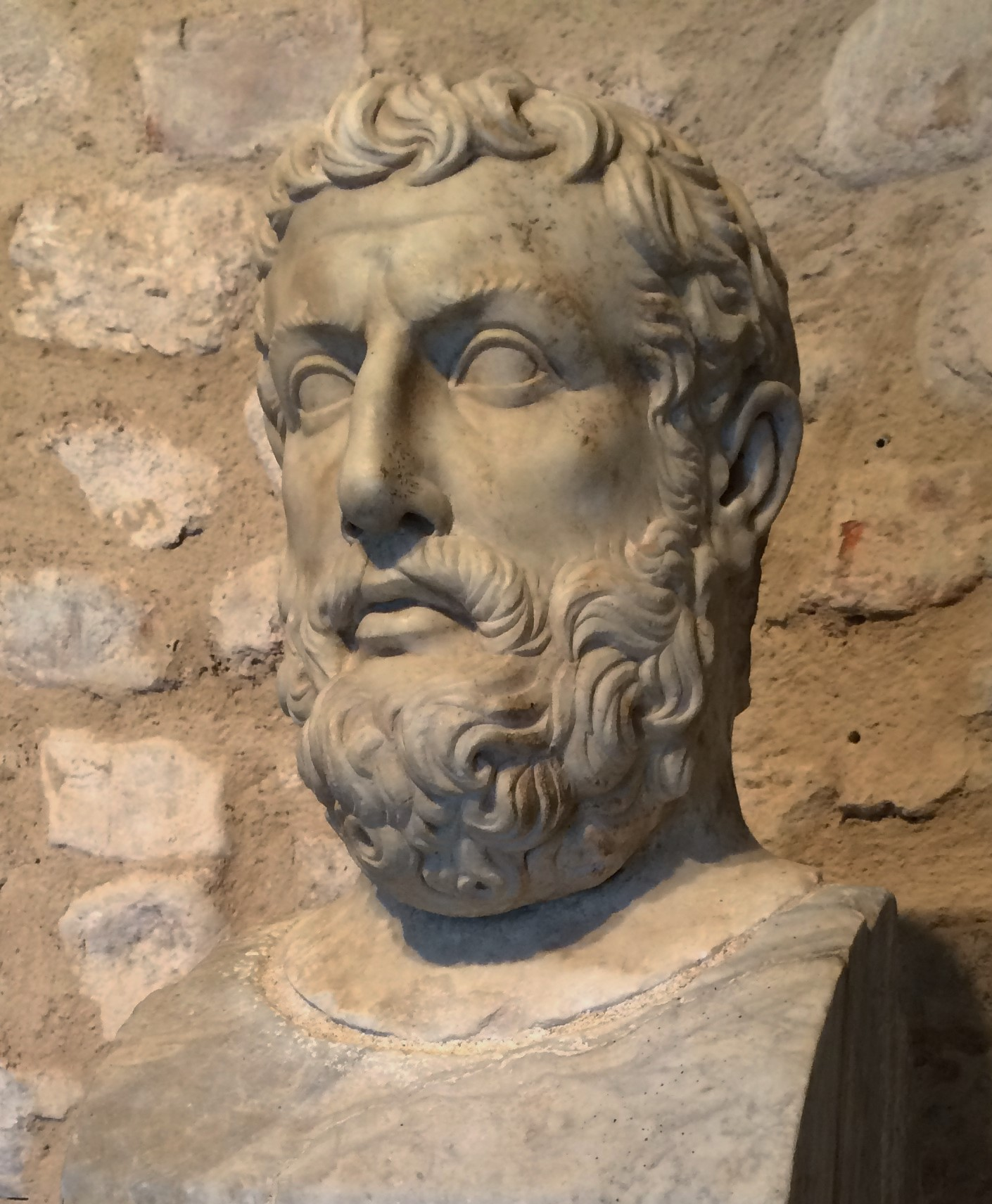
Parmenides was among the first to propose an ontological characterization of the fundamental nature of reality.

In the Greek philosophical tradition, Parmenides was among the first to propose an ontological characterization of the fundamental nature of existence. In the prologue (or proem) to On Nature, he describes two views of existence. Initially, nothing comes from nothing, thus existence is eternal. This posits that existence is what may be conceived of by thought, created, or possessed. Hence, there may be neither void nor vacuum, and true reality may neither come into being nor vanish from existence. Rather, the entirety of creation is eternal, uniform, and immutable, though not infinite (Parmenides characterized its shape as that of a perfect sphere). Parmenides thus posits that change, as perceived in everyday experience, is illusory.

Opposite to the Eleatic monism of Parmenides is the pluralistic conception of being. In the 5th century BCE, Anaxagoras and Leucippus replaced the reality of being (unique and unchanging) with that of becoming, therefore by a more fundamental and elementary ontic plurality. This thesis originated in the Hellenic world, stated in two different ways by Anaxagoras and by Leucippus. The first theory dealt with "seeds" (which Aristotle referred to as "homeomeries") of the various substances. The second was the atomistic theory, which dealt with reality as based on the vacuum, the atoms and their intrinsic movement in it.

The materialist atomism proposed by Leucippus was indeterminist, but Democritus (c. 460 – c. 370 BCE) subsequently developed it in a deterministic way. Later (4th century BCE), Epicurus took the original atomism again as indeterministic. He saw reality as composed of an infinity of indivisible, unchangeable corpuscles, or atoms (from the Greek atomon, lit. 'uncuttable'), but he gives weight to characterize atoms, whereas for Leucippus they are characterized by a "figure", an "order", and a "position" in the cosmos. Atoms are, besides, creating the whole with the intrinsic movement in the vacuum, producing the diverse flux of being. Their movement is influenced by the parenklisis (Lucretius names it clinamen) and that is determined by chance. These ideas foreshadowed the understanding of traditional physics until the advent of 20th-century theories on the nature of atoms.

Plato developed the distinction between true reality and illusion, in arguing that what is real are eternal and unchanging forms or ideas (a precursor to universals), of which things experienced in sensation are at best merely copies, and real only in so far as they copy ("partake of") such forms. In general, Plato presumes that all nouns (e.g., "beauty") refer to real entities, whether sensible bodies or insensible forms. Hence, in The Sophist, Plato argues that being is a form in which all existent things participate and which they have in common (though it is unclear whether "being" is intended in the sense of existence, copula, or identity); and argues, against Parmenides, that forms must exist not only of being, but also of negation and of non-being (or difference).

In his Categories, Aristotle (384–322 BCE) identifies ten possible kinds of things that may be the subject or the predicate of a proposition. For Aristotle there are four different ontological dimensions:

1. according to the various categories or ways of addressing a being as such
2. according to its truth or falsity (e.g., fake gold, counterfeit money)
3. whether it exists in and of itself or simply 'comes along' by accident
4. according to its potency, movement (energy) or finished presence (Metaphysics Book Theta).

=== Hindu philosophy ===
Ontology features in the Samkhya school of Hindu philosophy from the first millennium BCE. Samkhya philosophy regards the universe as consisting of two independent realities: puruṣa (pure, contentless consciousness) and prakṛti (matter). The substance dualism between puruṣa and prakṛti is similar but not identical to the substance dualism between mind and body that, following the works of Descartes, has been central to many disputes in the Western philosophical tradition. Samkhya sees the mind as being the subtle part of prakṛti. It is made up of three faculties: the sense mind (manas), the intellect (buddhi), and the ego (ahaṁkāra). These faculties perform various functions but are by themselves unable to produce consciousness, which belongs to a distinct ontological category and for which puruṣa alone is responsible. The Yoga school agrees with Samkhya philosophy on the fundamental dualism between puruṣa and prakṛti but it differs from Samkhya's atheistic position by incorporating the concept of a "personal, yet essentially inactive, deity" or "personal god" (Ishvara). These two schools stand in contrast to Advaita Vedanta, which adheres to non-duality by revealing that the apparent plurality of things is an illusion (Maya) hiding the true oneness of reality at its most fundamental level (Brahman).

=== Native American Ontologies ===
The ontological turn in philosophy has been a framework that reconsiders how nonhuman beings and even objects previously seen as inanimate, influence, affect, and relate to human conceptions of the world popularized by Bruno Latour. However, Métis scholar Zoe Todd states that this “turn” is not a new idea, as it does not incorporate Indigenous scholars or ontologies even though Indigenous ontologies have been around for much longer than European ontologies. Specifically, Todd argues that the ontological turn as represented by Latour, is “an awful lot like the little bit of Inuit cosmological thought I have been taught by Inuit friends.” Such a turn, Todd explains, erases Indigenous ontologies in-place far longer than Latour’s turn.

Indigenous people live with meaningful and intentional relations with lands and waters. This includes viewing certain non-human entities as having agency and life, affording them respect as a fellow life form. Many Indigenous people engage with water and land as an educational tool by which to understand the world.

Yellowknives Dene philosopher Glen Coulthard explains that knowledge of land and its ability to act, influence, and connect beings can be viewed as “grounded normativity”, where Indigenous reciprocal relationships to the non-human world, like land or water, are inherently tied to their surroundings. These practices are directly defined by place due to Indigenous forms of knowledge being closely linked with an understanding of the non-human world around them. Indigenous relations to the land generate the processes, practices, and knowledges that inform their political systems, through which they practice solidarity. Coulthard, in his book “Red Skin, White Masks", explains that grounded normativity are the “modalities of Indigenous land-connected practices and longstanding experiential knowledge that inform and structure our ethical engagements with the world and our relationships with human and nonhuman others over time”

Nationally recognized experts on Native Americans, history professor Theda Perdue and American studies professor Michael Green, explain the importance of the non-human world to the Cherokee Nation. The people of the Cherokee Nation associate spiritual power to the non-human world, including plants, animals, rivers, mountains, caves, and other landforms. This is best explained by the Cherokee origin of disease and medicine story, wherein plants provide Cherokee people with the medicine necessary to combat disease. In one of the Cherokee origin stories relayed by Perdue and Greene, the world began with only the sky and water, with animals living above the solid rock vault that formed the sky. Due to it being too crowded, a little water beetle swam below the water and brought soft mud to the surface, which began to grow and form the island that became the Earth. While waiting for the earth to dry, The Great Buzzard flew low over the land to see if it was ready for the animals to inhabit it. By the time he reached the Cherokee country, he was tired and his wings struck the ground making valleys and mountains. The first human beings to live in this land, a brother and sister, came only after the plants and animals.

Haudenosaunee people too, are intimately linked to the land and see it as an actor. Their historical knowledge and names record their relationship to land, the constant element of their world. They recognize that land is the prime determinant of their identity, that they are born from the land and will return to the land once they die. Haudenosaunee people believe that land was intended to provide for them and that they have an obligation to respect the earth and to maintain a sustainable relationship with their land. One version of the Haudenosaunee creation story alludes to a special power held within the earth, a combination of all the things that brought it into existence thanks to the non-human world. Various animals were created by forming soil into the physical shape of the being and given life through breath. Haudenosaunee people view that life comes from the earth and once it’s completed it will return to the earth allowing for future life. This also applies to how Haudenosaunee Nations identify themselves, as people of the flint, standing stone, hills, marshy area, or great hills. Haudenosaunee believe that land does not belong to Native people, but rather Native people belong to the land.

According to Mississauga Nishnaabeg scholar Leanne Betasamosake Simpson, Anishinaabe communities all have deep reciprocal relationships with the Great Lakes, particularly Lake Ontario and the waterways that flow into it. These reciprocal relationships also encompass the plants and animals who benefit and exist because of the water, including the Nation itself. Anishinaabe society is constituted by the interactions between the non-human world rather than solely human-to-human interactions. These philosophies are emphasized within the Anishnaabe origin story, where the non-human world takes a bigger focus than human influence. Ecosystems and habitats are understood as societies in which all non-humans are active members, who directly affect how humans organize themselves within the society. For example, Watts explains that her “reciprocal duties to others guide every aspect of how I position myself and my work, and this relationality informs the ethics that drive how I live up to my duties to humans, animals, land, water, climate and every other aspect of the world(s) I inhabit”

Members of the Mohegan Nation share a similar intimate relationship with the land. The Mohegan Hill, along the Route 32 highway in southern Connecticut, is particularly important. This is mainly due to Mohegan belief that they aren’t simply spiritually tied to the hill, but come from it. The Mohegan Nation believe that the Mohegan spirit is especially present around the hill, with gentle spirits protecting those who live there. The rocks within the Mohegan Hill are also especially important. In Mohegan language the spirit of rocks is acknowledged in the names of their leaders: a male leader is called Sachem (meaning rock man) and a woman leader is referred to as Sunqsquaw (which translates to rock woman).

== Medieval ==
Medieval ontology was strongly influenced by Aristotle's teachings. The thinkers of this period often relied on Aristotelian categories like substance, act and potency, or matter and form to formulate their own theories. Important ontologists in this epoch include Avicenna, Thomas Aquinas, Duns Scotus, and William of Ockham.

According to Avicenna's interpretation of Greek Aristotelian and Platonist ontological doctrines in medieval metaphysics, being is either necessary, contingent qua possible, or impossible. Necessary being is that which cannot but be, since its non-being would entail a contradiction. Contingent qua possible being is neither necessary nor impossible for it to be or not to be. It is ontologically neutral, and is brought from potential existing into actual existence by way of a cause that is external to its essence. Its being is borrowed—unlike the necessary existent, which is self-subsisting and impossible not to be. As for the impossible, it necessarily does not exist, and the affirmation of its being would involve a contradiction.

Fundamental to Thomas Aquinas's ontology is his distinction between essence and existence: all entities are conceived as composites of essence and existence. The essence of a thing is what this thing is like, it signifies the definition of this thing. God has a special status since He is the only entity whose essence is identical to its existence. But for all other, finite entities there is a real distinction between essence and existence. This distinction shows itself, for example, in our ability to understand the essence of something without knowing about its existence. Aquinas conceives of existence as an act of being that actualizes the potency given by the essence. Different things have different essences, which impose different limits on the corresponding act of being. The paradigm examples of essence-existence composites are material substances like cats or trees. Aquinas incorporates Aristotle's distinction between matter and form by holding that the essence of material things, as opposed to the essence of immaterial things like angels, is the composition of their matter and form. So, for example, the essence of a marble statue would be the composition of the marble (its matter) and the shape it has (its form). Form is universal since substances made of different matter can have the same form. The forms of a substance may be divided into substantial and accidental forms. A substance can survive a change of an accidental form, but ceases to exist upon a change of a substantial form.

== Modern ==
Ontology is increasingly seen as a separate domain of philosophy in the modern period. Many ontological theories of this period were rationalistic in the sense that they saw ontology largely as a deductive discipline that starts from a small set of first principles or axioms, a position best exemplified by Baruch Spinoza and Christian Wolff. This rationalism in metaphysics and ontology was strongly opposed by Immanuel Kant, who insisted that many claims arrived at this way are to be dismissed since they go beyond any possible experience that could justify them.

René Descartes' ontological distinction between mind and body has been one of the most influential parts of his philosophy. On his view, minds are thinking things while bodies are extended things. Thought and extension are two attributes that each come in various modes of being. Modes of thinking include judgments, doubts, volitions, sensations and emotions while the shapes of material things are modes of extension. Modes come with a lower degree of reality since they depend for their existence on a substance. Substances, on the other hand, can exist on their own. Descartes' substance dualism asserts that every finite substance is either a thinking substance or an extended substance. This position does not entail that minds and bodies actually are separated from each other, which would defy the intuition that we both have a body and a mind. Instead, it implies that minds and bodies can, at least in principle, be separated, since they are distinct substances and therefore are capable of independent existence. A longstanding problem for substance dualism since its inception has been to explain how minds and bodies can causally interact with each other, as they apparently do, when a volition causes an arm to move or when light falling on the retina causes a visual impression.

Baruch Spinoza is well known for his substance monism: the thesis that only one substance exists. He refers to this substance as "God or Nature", emphasizing both his pantheism and his naturalism. This substance has an infinite amount of attributes, which he defines as "what the intellect perceives of substance as constituting its essence". Of these attributes, only two are accessible to the human mind: thought and extension. Modes are properties of a substance that follow from its attributes and therefore have only a dependent form of existence. Spinoza sees everyday-things like rocks, cats or ourselves as mere modes and thereby opposes the traditional Aristotelian and Cartesian conception of categorizing them as substances. Modes compose deterministic systems in which the different modes are linked to each other as cause and effect. Each deterministic system corresponds to one attribute: one for extended things, one for thinking things, and so forth. Causal relations only happen within a system while the different systems run in parallel without causally interacting with each other. Spinoza calls the system of modes Natura naturata ("nature natured"), and opposes it to Natura naturans ("nature naturing"), the attributes responsible for the modes. Everything in Spinoza's system is necessary: there are no contingent entities. This is so since the attributes are themselves necessary and since the system of modes follows from them.

Christian Wolff defines ontology as the science of being in general. He sees it as a part of metaphysics besides cosmology, psychology and natural theology. According to Wolff, it is a deductive science, knowable a priori and based on two fundamental principles: the principle of non-contradiction ("it cannot happen that the same thing is and is not") and the principle of sufficient reason ("nothing exists without a sufficient reason for why it exists rather than does not exist"). Beings are defined by their determinations or predicates, which cannot involve a contradiction. Determinates come in three types: essentialia, attributes, and modes. Essentialia define the nature of a being and are therefore necessary properties of this being. Attributes are determinations that follow from essentialia and are equally necessary, in contrast to modes, which are merely contingent. Wolff conceives existence as just one determination among others, which a being may lack. Ontology is interested in being at large, not just in actual being. But all beings, whether actually existing or not, have a sufficient reason. The sufficient reason for things without actual existence consists in all the determinations that make up the essential nature of this thing. Wolff refers to this as a "reason of being" and contrasts it with a "reason of becoming", which explains why some things have actual existence.

Arthur Schopenhauer was a proponent of metaphysical voluntarism: he regards will as the underlying and ultimate reality. Reality as a whole consists only of one will, which is equated with the Kantian thing-in-itself. Like the Kantian thing-in-itself, the will exists outside space and time. But, unlike the Kantian thing-in-itself, the will has an experiential component to it: it comes in the form of striving, desiring, feeling, and so forth. The manifold of things we encounter in our everyday experiences, like trees or cars, are mere appearances that lack existence independent of the observer. Schopenhauer describes them as objectivations of the will. These objectivations happen in different "steps", which correspond to the Platonic forms. All objectivations are grounded in the will. This grounding is governed by the principium individuationis, which enables a manifold of individual things spread out in space and time to be grounded in the one will.

== 20th century ==
Dominant approaches to ontology in the 20th century were phenomenology, linguistic analysis, and naturalism. Phenomenological ontology, as exemplified by Edmund Husserl and Martin Heidegger, relies for its method on the description of experience. Linguistic analysis assigns to language a central role for ontology, as seen, for example, in Rudolf Carnap's thesis that the truth value of existence-claims depends on the linguistic framework in which they are made. Naturalism gives a prominent position to the natural sciences for the purpose of finding and evaluating ontological claims. This position is exemplified by Willard Van Orman Quine's method of ontology, which involves analyzing the ontological commitments of scientific theories.

Edmund Husserl sees ontology as a science of essences. Sciences of essences are contrasted with factual sciences: the former are knowable a priori and provide the foundation for the later, which are knowable a posteriori. Ontology as a science of essences is not interested in actual facts, but in the essences themselves, whether they have instances or not. Husserl distinguishes between formal ontology, which investigates the essence of objectivity in general, and regional ontologies, which study regional essences that are shared by all entities belonging to the region. Regions correspond to the highest genera of concrete entities: material nature, personal consciousness, and interpersonal spirit. Husserl's method for studying ontology and sciences of essence in general is called eidetic variation. It involves imagining an object of the kind under investigation and varying its features. The changed feature is inessential to this kind if the object can survive its change, otherwise it belongs to the kind's essence. For example, a triangle remains a triangle if one of its sides is extended, but it ceases to be a triangle if a fourth side is added. Regional ontology involves applying this method to the essences corresponding to the highest genera.

Central to Martin Heidegger's philosophy is the notion of ontological difference: the difference between being as such and specific entities. He accuses the philosophical tradition of being forgetful of this distinction, which has led to the mistake of understanding being as such as a kind of ultimate entity, for example as "idea, energeia, substance, monad or will to power". Heidegger tries to rectify this mistake in his own "fundamental ontology" by focusing on the meaning of being instead, a project which is akin to contemporary meta-ontology. One method to achieve this is by studying the human being, or Dasein, in Heidegger's terminology. The reason for this is that we already have a pre-ontological understanding of being that shapes how we experience the world. Phenomenology can be used to make this implicit understanding explicit, but it has to be accompanied by hermeneutics in order to avoid the distortions due to the forgetfulness of being. In his later philosophy, Heidegger attempted to reconstruct the "history of being" in order to show how the different epochs in the history of philosophy were dominated by different conceptions of being. His goal is to retrieve the original experience of being present in the early Greek thought that was covered up by later philosophers.

Nicolai Hartmann is a 20th-century philosopher within the Continental tradition of philosophy. He interprets ontology as Aristotle's science of being qua being: the science of the most general characteristics of entities, usually referred to as categories, and the relations between them. According to Hartmann, the most general categories are moments of being (existence and essence), modes of being (reality and ideality), and modalities of being (possibility, actuality, and necessity). Every entity has both existence and essence. Reality and ideality, by contrast, are two disjunctive categories: every entity is either real or ideal. Ideal entities are universal, returnable and always existing, while real entities are individual, unique, and destructible. Among the ideal entities are mathematical objects and values. The modalities of being are divided into the absolute modalities (actuality and non-actuality) and the relative modalities (possibility, impossibility, and necessity). The relative modalities are relative in the sense that they depend on the absolute modalities: something is possible, impossible, or necessary because something else is actual. Hartmann asserts that reality is made up of four levels (inanimate, biological, psychological, and spiritual) that form a hierarchy.

Rudolf Carnap proposed that the truth value of ontological statements about the existence of entities depends on the linguistic framework in which these statements are made: they are internal to the framework. As such, they are often trivial in that it just depends on the rules and definitions within this framework. For example, it follows analytically from the rules and definitions within the mathematical framework that numbers exist. The problem Carnap saw with traditional ontologists is that they try to make framework-independent or external statements about what really is the case. Such statements are at best pragmatic considerations about which framework to choose, and at worst outright meaningless, according to Carnap. For example, there is no matter of fact as to whether realism or idealism is true: their truth depends on the adopted framework. The job of philosophers is not to discover which things exist by themselves but is a kind of "conceptual engineering" to create interesting frameworks and to explore the consequences of adopting them. Since there is no framework-independent notion of truth, the choice of framework is guided by practical considerations like expedience or fruitfulness.

The notion of ontological commitment plays a central role in Willard Van Orman Quine's contributions to ontology. A theory is ontologically committed to an entity if that entity must exist in order for the theory to be true. Quine proposed that the best way to determine this is by translating the theory in question into first-order predicate logic. Of special interest in this translation are the logical constants known as existential quantifiers, whose meaning corresponds to expressions like "there exists..." or "for some...". They are used to bind the variables in the expression following the quantifier. The ontological commitments of the theory then correspond to the variables bound by existential quantifiers. This approach is summed up by Quine's famous dictum that "[t]o be is to be the value of a variable". This method by itself is not sufficient for ontology since it depends on a theory in order to result in ontological commitments. Quine proposed that we should base our ontology on our best scientific theory. Various followers of Quine's method chose to apply it to different fields, for example to "everyday conceptions expressed in natural language".
