= David Conway (philosopher) =

British academic philosopher (born 1947)

David Conway (born 1947) is a British academic philosopher who has written several books on philosophy and politics. He has been described as "a classical liberal who thinks nations are essential".

== Life ==
Conway grew up in London, where he attended St Olave's Grammar School. He read Philosophy as an undergraduate at Clare College, Cambridge, in the 1960s and went on to obtain his doctorate in Philosophy from University College London. He taught at Middlesex University for over thirty years, where he was Professor of Philosophy. He subsequently worked at Roehampton University as a senior research fellow in Theology and Religious Studies. Conway then worked for Civitas, an independent British think tank, as a senior research fellow.

== Bibliography ==
- A Farewell to Marx: An Outline and Appraisal of His Theories (Penguin Books, 1987)
- Classical Liberalism: The Unvanquished Ideal (Palgrave Macmillan, 1995)
- Free-Market Feminism (Institute of Economic Affairs, 1998)
- The Rediscovery of Wisdom: From Here to Antiquity in Quest of ‘Sophia’ (Palgrave Macmillan, 2000)
- In Defence of the Realm: The Place of Nations in Classical Liberalism (Ashgate Publishing Group, 2004)
- A Nation of Immigrants? (CIVITAS, 2007)
- Liberal Education and the National Curriculum (CIVITAS, 2010)
- With Friends Like These: Why Britain Should Leave the EU – And How (CIVITAS, 2014)
- Encyclopedia article – Hamowy, Ronald, ed. (2008). "Liberalism, Classical". The Encyclopedia of Libertarianism. Thousand Oaks, CA: SAGE Publications, Cato Institute. pp. 295–98. doi:10.4135/9781412965811.n179. ISBN 978-1-4129-6580-4. LCCN 2008009151. OCLC 750831024.
