= Françoise Meltzer =

Françoise Meltzer (born 1947) is a professor of Philosophy of Religion at the University of Chicago Divinity School. She is the Chair of Comparative Literature at the University of Chicago.

== Work ==
Meltzer's scholarship includes work on contemporary critical theory and nineteenth-century French literature. She marshals postmodern critical theories in order to explore literary representations of the subject.

In her book Hot Property: The Stakes and Claims of Literary Originality, she examines the ideas of originality and authorship in a series of case studies from Descartes to Walter Benjamin. In her book on Joan of Arc, she undertakes a study of that figure in relation to subjectivity as it is treated in philosophical and literary theoretical courses.

Meltzer co-edited a Symposium on [God] for the journal Critical Inquiry. With Jas' Elsner, Meltzer co-edited a special issue of Critical Inquiry on theories of saints and sainthood in three monotheistic religions. She is co-editing a book on religion and postmodernist texts, and also working on two monographs; one about 1848 in France, and the concept of rupture from a philosophical, political, and literary point of view; the other about the gendering of subjectivity.

== Education ==
- Ph.D. Comparative Literature, University of California, Berkeley, 1975
- M.A. Comparative Literature, University of California, Berkeley, 1971
- B.A. Ohio University, 1969

== Bibliography ==
- (1987) Salome and the Dance of Writing: Portraits of Mimesis in Literature
- (1988) The Trial(s) of Psychoanalysis, sed.
- (1994) Hot Property: The Stakes and Claims of Literary Originality
- (2001) For Fear, Fire: Joan of Arc and the Limits of Subjectivity
- (2011) Double Vision: Baudelaire's Modernity

== See also ==
- Deconstruction
- List of deconstructionists
