= Janneke Louisa =

Dutch civil servant and politician

Janneke Louisa-Muller (born 1965) is a Dutch civil servant and former politician. From 12 May 2012 to 1 January 2013 she was Party Chairwoman of the ChristianUnion (ChristenUnie). She succeeded Peter Blokhuis and was succeeded by Klaas Tigelaar. Furthermore, she is town clerk of Wijk bij Duurstede.

Louisa studied social and economic geography at the University of Groningen. She is married, lives in Cothen, and is an Evangelical.
