= Ole Fogh Kirkeby =

Danish philosopher

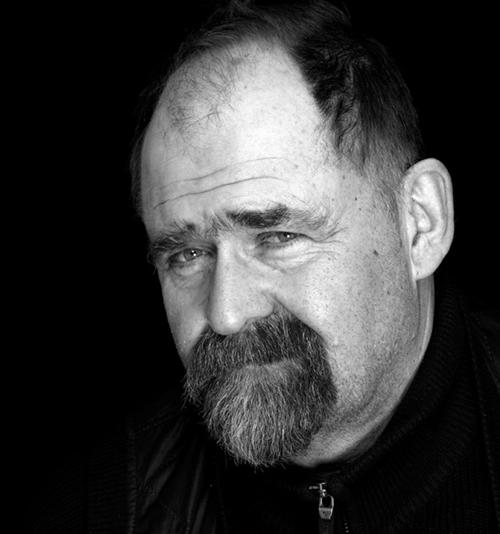
- Born: 1947 (age 78–79); Copenhagen, Denmark

Ole Fogh Kirkeby (born 1947) is a Danish philosopher and a professor at Copenhagen Business School in the Philosophy of Leadership.

== Education ==
He is a Doctor of Philosophy from Aarhus University, graduated with honours, 1994, with the dissertation "Event and Body-mind. A phenomenological-hermeneutic Analysis". He has an MA (mag.art.) in the History of Ideas from Aarhus University.

== Career ==
As a professional philosopher, Kirkeby focused on the event as the centre of being. In order to describe the event, he conceived it as a way in which the body-mind (his neologism) absorbed the event by being absorbed by it. The media in which this takes place is language. Thus Kirkeby combined the theory of language games, and the phenomenological tradition, with its emphasis on self-reflective being (Heidegger), and the theory of bodily incorporation developed by Merleau-Ponty, interpreted through the Stoic vocabulary of the event, into an epistemological theory of the way in which we are “evented”.

In his philosophical trilogy about the event, with the volumes ”Eventum Tantum – The Ethos of the Event (“Eventum Tantum - Begivenhedens ethos,” København: Samfundslitteratur, 2005); Beauty Happens. The Aesthetics of the Event (“Skønheden sker. Begivenhedens æstetik. København: Samfundslitteratur 2007): and The Self happens. The Event of Consciousness (”Selvet sker. Bevidsthedens begivenhed”. Samfundslitteratur) 2008, he created a new framework for approaching the event.

Kirkeby developed a theory of the Good and Welfare, which will be published in the autumn 2011 by Gyldendal, Copenhagen.

Kirkeby also worked intensively with business economics, creating a new agenda for leadership, exerting a great influence on managers in Denmark. He focused a radical-normative perspective on leadership, emphasizing leadership virtues, the duty of the leader to make values real, and the indispensable importance of the leader to know himself. He wrote several bestsellers inside this field, among others The Philosophy of Management. A Radical-Normative Perspective ("Ledelsesfilosofi. Et Radikalt Normativt Perspektiv", København: Samfundslitteratur, 1997, translated to Swedish); The New Leadership ("Det Nye Lederskab". København: Børsens Forlag, 2004); and The Leadership of the Event and the Force of Action ("Begivenhedsledelse og handlekraft". Børsens Forlag. København 2006).

In English, these topics of business economics are published in the books Management Philosophy. A Radical-Normative Perspective, Heidelberg and New York: Springer Verlag 2000; The Virtue of Leadership. Copenhagen: CBS Press 2007; and The New Protreptic. The Concept and the Art. Copenhagen: CBS Press 2009.

Kirkeby has been active as an author of fiction with the books Philosophical Stories ("Filosofiske Fortællinger". København: Lindhardt & Ringhof, 2004); More Philosophical Short Stories (Flere filosofiske fortællinger: Lindhardt og Ringhof, København 2008).

From 1996 to 2000, Kirkeby co-developed and was the head of the studyboard at the MSc study programmes in Economics & Business Administration (cand.merc.) at the Copenhagen Business School, Denmark. In 2002, Kirkeby founded the Center for Art and Leadership at CBS, with particular emphasis on the way arts are able to inspire leadership. He still functions as its director. In 2003 he co-founded a Danish think tank on Public Governance together with The SAS Institute, Denmark. From 2006 to 2008 he was Professor II at Trøndelag Research & Development, Norway, in Art, business and philosophy.

In 2007 he developed experimental theatre together with Bent Noergaard, developing and participating in the play The Creative Human Being, Centre for Art and Science, SDU. In 2008 he hosted the re-casting the draft to a new law of Danish Theatre together with a group of experts. In 2010 he wrote the dramatic draft for Cantabile-II, Project Seek-to-Seek, participating himself as an actor.

== Selected publications ==
=== Books in English ===
- The New Protreptic. The Concept and the Art. Copenhagen: CBS Press 2009.
- The Virtue of Leadership. Copenhagen: CBS Press 2007.
- Management Philosophy. A Radical-Normative Perspective. Heidelberg and New York: Springer Verlag 2000.

=== Articles in English ===
- Phronesis and the sense of the event. International Yearbook of Action research. 5(1), 2009.
- Management Philosophy. The Sage Handbook of New Approaches in Management and Organization Studies.. 2008. London.
- Leadership as a Possible Mode of existence." in Consulting the Nordic Way, (Oslo: Cappelen Akademisk Forlag, 2005)
- The eventum tantum. To make the world worthy of what could happen to it" In Ephemera, Critical Dialogues on Organisations. ISSN 1473-2866 26 p. Oct. 2004.
- "Loyalty and the Sense of Place". In Spiritual and Ethics in Management, edt. L. Zolnay. (Kluwer, Dordrecht, 2004)
- "The Greek Square, or The Normative challenge of Aesthetics" Ephemera, Critical Dialogues on Organisations ISSN 1473-2866. 22 p. Nov. 2003.
- "Thoughts on the Opposite of the Event", in The Vital Coincidence, red. J. Hein & F. Janning, (Walther Koenig Books, 2003)
- "Reflections on Organisational Therapy." in Philosophy in Society, edt. by H.Herrestad et.a. (Unipubforlag. Oslo 2002 )
- “A Metaphor called "Mozart". in Hermes. Journal of Linguistics, 21p., (Århus: Handelshøjskolen i Århus 24, 2000)
- “Towards a Hemerneutics of Regions. In Invoking a Transnational Metropolis. The Making of the Øresund Region. Red. P.O.Berg et al., 26 p., (Lund: Studentlitteratur, 2000)
- “Event and Body-Mind. An Outline of a post- postmodern Approach to Phenomenology. In Cybernetics & Human Knowing . Vol 4. No. 2-3. 31p.(1997. )

=== Books in Danish ===
- Hvad er filosofi. Content Publishing.2018.
- Robusthed, skrøbelighed og det generøse lederskab. Gyldendal 2017.
- Protreptik: Selvindsigt & Samtalepraksis. Samfundslitteratur 2016.
- Ordet er sjælens spejl: Samtaler, der befrier. Gyldendal 2017.
- Blues og Lederskab - from Good to Great. Med Sletterød, N. A., Myhren, R. & Kirkeby, O. F. 2015 Steinkjer: Trøndelag Forskning og Utvikling.
- Den anden død: En filosofisk fremtidskrimi. København: Paraskeue 2015.
- Helth, P. & Kirkeby, O. F. Menneske og leder: Bliv den du er. Akademisk Forlag 2015.
- Eventologien. Begivenhedsfilosofiens indhold og konsekvenser. Samfundslitteratur 2013.
- Hvem er jeg. Om sjælens billeder. En lille bog om det man måske kan vide om sig selv.

Gyldendal 2013.

- Eventologien. Begivenhedsfilosofiens indhold og konsekvenser. * *Samfundslitteratur 2013.
- Hvem er jeg. Om sjælens billeder. En lille bog om det man måske kan vide om sig selv. Gyldendal 2013.
- Om velfærd : Den godes politik. København : Gyldendal, 2011
- Den frie organisation. Balancen mellem passion og storsind. Gyldendal 2009
- Protreptik. Filosofisk coaching i ledelse”. Samfundslitteratur, 2008.
- Selvet sker. Bevidsthedens begivenhed. Samfundslitteratur 2008.
- Skønheden sker. Begivenhedens æstetik. (Beauty Happens. The Aesthetic of the Event).København: Samfundslitteratur 2007.
- Menneske og leder. Bliv den du er.” (Human Being and Leader. Become the one yoy are) med Poula Helth. København: Børsens Forlag 2007.
- Filosofiske fiksérbilleder. København: Lindhardt & Ringhof 2006.
- Fusionsledelse - en huspostil for strukturreformensledere (The Management of Merging. A book for the managers of the reform of the public sector), co-author Lars Goldschmidt, (København: Børsens Forlag, 2005)
- Eventum Tantum - Begivenhedens ethos. (Eventum tantum, The ethos of the event)(København: Samfundslitteratur, 2005)
- Filosofiske Fortællinger. (Philosophical Stories) (København: Lindhardt & Ringhof, 2004)
- Det Nye Lederskab. (The New Leadership). (København: Børsens Forlag, 2004.)
- Loyalitet. Udfordringen for ledere og medarbejdere. (Loyalitet – the Challenge of Managers and Employees), (København: Samfundslitteratur, 2002)
- Organisationsfilosofi. En studie i liminalitet. (The Philosophy of Organisations. A study of Liminality), (København: Samfundslitteratur, 2001)
- “Secunda philosophia”, (København: Samfundslitteratur, 1999)
- ”Om Betydning. Tetragrammatonske Refleksioner”, (On Sense. Tetragrammatonical Reflections). (København: Handelshøjskolens Forlag, 1998).
- ”Ledelsesfilosofi. Et Radikalt Normativt Perspektiv”, (The Philosophy of Management. A Radical-Normative Perspective). (København: Samfundslitteratur, 1997).
- ”Selvnødighedens filosofi”, (The Philosophy of Selfceissity), (Århus: Modtryk, 1996)
- ”Ordenes tid. Fragmenter til en sirlig filosofi”, (The Seasons of Words. Fragments of a Meticulous Philosophy), (København: Det lille Forlag, 1996)
- ”Begivenhed og krops-tanke. En fænomenologisk- hermeneutisk analyse”, (Event and Body- Mind. A Phenomenological-hermeneutical Analysis), (Århus: Modtryk, 1994, Doctor Dissertation)

=== Articles in Danish ===
- ”At være tro mod sig selv”, printed in Børsens Ledelseshåndbøger, (2005)
- ”Amatørens rum. I ’Kunst af Lyst’ ”, red. Bente Schindel, printed in Kulturelle Samråd i Danmark, (København, 2005) p. 47-61.
- ”Brandingens filosofi – filosofiens branding”. Printed in ”125-R – varemærkeloven 1880-2005 – et overblik”, (DJØF's Forlag 2005)
- "To noter om pædagogik og lederskab" printed in Dansk Pædagogisk Tidsskrift. 3. (2004., Sept.)
- "Filosoffen og kunstneren", Printed in Dansk Pædagogisk Tidsskrift, 4, (2003 Dec.)
- "Kødets ånd - åndens kød. Nogle bemærkninger til Plotins diapleko-figur i Enneaden". Printed in Kritisk Forum for praktisk teologi. No.90. Dec 2002.
- ”Om loyalitet”. Printed on Forlaget Thomsons hrm-on-line. 2002.
- "En teoretisk indfaldsvinkel til fænomenet medarbejderloyalitet". Printed in Børsens Loyalitetshåndbog. 4/November 2001.
- ”Aspekter af tillidens fænomenologi”. Printed in Det handler om tillid, red. Af A. Bordum & S. Wenneberg. København: Samfundslitteratur, 2001.
