= Peter Blokhuis =

Dutch philosopher and politician

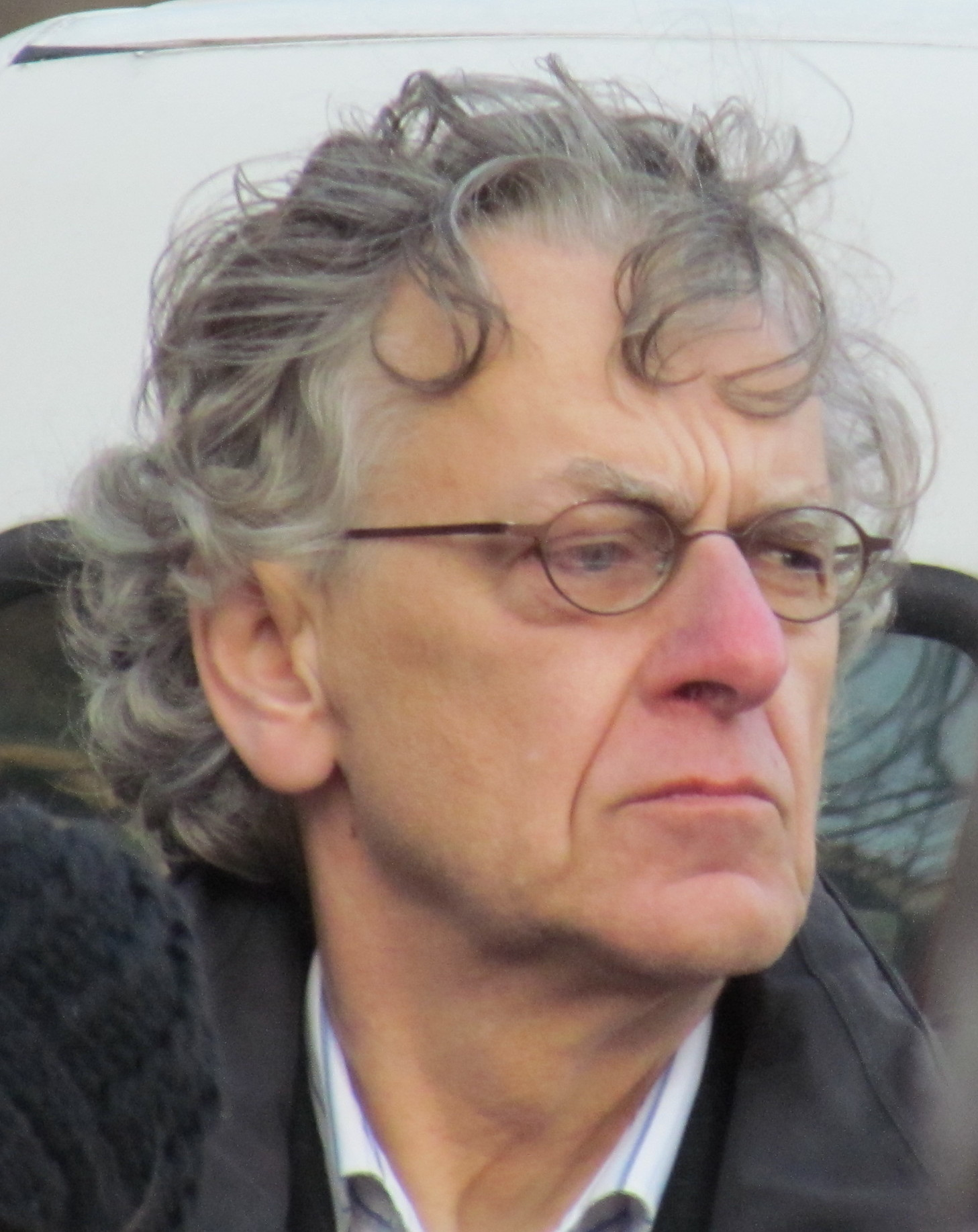
Blokhuis in 2011

Peter Blokhuis (born 7 February 1947 in Baambrugge) is a Dutch philosopher and politician. From 9 April 2005 to 12 May 2012, he was Party Chairman of the ChristianUnion. He was succeeded by Janneke Louisa.
