= Konstanty Michalski =

Polish Catholic theologian and philosopher (1879–1947)

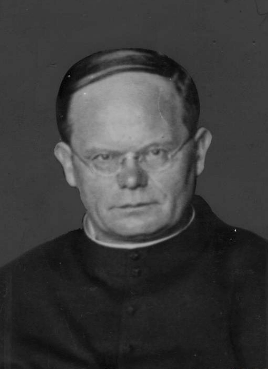
- Born: Konstanty Józef Michalski; 12 April 1879; Dąbrówka Mała
- Died: 6 August 1947 (aged 68); Kraków

Academic background
- Education: UCLouvain (PhD); Jagiellonian University (dr hab.)

Academic work
- Discipline: Medieval philosophy
- Institutions: Institute of Theology; Jagiellonian University

Konstanty Józef Michalski CM (12 April 1879 – 6 August 1947) was a Polish Catholic theologian and philosopher. Educated at Jagiellonian University and UCLouvain, he was professor of Christian philosophy at Jagiellonian University from 1919 to his death in 1947, serving as the University's rector from 1931 to 1932.

== Biography ==
Michalski was born on 12 April 1879 in Dąbrówka Mała to Ignacy and Paulina Michalski (née Winkler). He underwent elementary education at Siemianowice Śląskie. In 1896, he joined the Congregation of the Mission, attending a minor seminary run by the Congregation in Kraków until his graduation in 1900. He then studied theology and philosophy at the Congregation's Institute of Theology in Kraków, while also attending lectures about Christology at Jagiellonian University. Michalski was ordained a priest in 1903 at Wawel Cathedral by Anatol Nowak. After his ordination, he served as a teacher of world literature and the Polish language at a Congregation-run gymnasium, while also lecturing on the history of philosophy and paterology at the Institute of Theology.

Between 1900 and 1906, Michalski studied Slavic studies at Jagiellonian University; afterwards, he served as a catechist at a girls' gymnasium in Kraków between 1906 and 1908. From 1908 to 1911, he studied at UCLouvain, from which he obtained a licentiate in 1910 and a doctorate in philosophy on 15 February 1911 due to his dissertation, La réaction contre le psychologisme en Allemagne. Husserl, ses prédecésseurs et ses partisans. Upon returning to Poland, he taught philosophy at the Institute of Theology between 18 February 1911 and 31 August 1914. On 7 January 1914, he was appointed as a professor at Jagiellonian University; he served as an associate professor of Christian philosophy and apologetics from January 1914 to April 1919. On 26 November 1918, he received a habilitation in Christian philosophy; given his habilitation, he was appointed as a professor of Christian philosophy at Jagiellonian University on 14 May 1919, teaching to first-year and second-year students. He was given tenure on 24 August 1921.

Michalski served as dean of the Faculty of Theology at Jagiellonian University for 4 terms between 1923 and 1937. On 10 June 1927, Michalski became a member of the Polish Academy of Learning's section for history & philosophy, serving as its delegate to the Union Académique Internationale between 1928 and 1947. Between 1931 and 1932, he served as rector of Jagiellonian University; during his term, he expanded the University's library. He was awarded the Commander's Cross of the Order of Polonia Restituta in 1936 and made an officier of the Legion of Honour in 1937. He was arrested on 6 November 1939 alongside other professors at the Collegium Novum and held at a prison near Wrocław; he was transferred to Sachsenhausen, from which he was released in February 1940. That same year, he became a member of the Pontifical Academy of Saint Thomas Aquinas. Michalski resumed his duties as professor in March 1945. He died on 6 August 1947 in Kraków, and was buried in Rakowice Cemetery.

== Works ==
- Tomizm w Polsce na przełomie XV i XVI w. (Thomism in Poland at the Turn of the 15th and 16th Centuries; 1911)
- Odrodzenie nominalizmu w XIV w. (The Rebirth of Nominalism in the 14th Century; 1926).

== See also ==
- History of philosophy in Poland
- List of Poles

== Bibliography ==
- "Michalski, Konstanty". Encyklopedia Powszechna PWN (in Polish). Vol. 3. Warsaw: Państwowe Wydawnictwo Naukowe. 1975. p. 104.
- Piech, Stanisław (1998). "Księdza Konstantego Michalskiego życie i dzieło. W pięćdziesiątą rocznicę śmierci". Folia Historica Cracoviensia (in Polish). 5: 261–277. doi:10.15633/fhc.1313.
- Piech, Stanisław (2018). "Konstanty Michalski CM – historyk filozofii wieków średnich". Tarnowskie Studia Teologiczne (in Polish). 37 (1–2): 141–165. doi:10.15633/tst.3256.
