= Vincent Riolo =

Maltese philosopher

- Born: 1947; Mosta, Malta
- Occupation: Philosophy

Vincent Riolo (born 1947) is a Maltese philosopher mostly interested and specialised in logic and the philosophy of language.

== Life ==
Riolo was born at Mosta, Malta, in 1947. He studied philosophy at the University of Malta and the University of Erlangen-Nuremberg in Bavaria, Germany, where he was a student of Paul Lorenzen (March 24, 1915 – October 1, 1994), founder of the Erlangen School. Riolo teaches logic at various faculties of the University of Malta. At the Department of Philosophy he also teaches philosophy of science.

== Works ==
The late Rev. Prof. Peter Serracino Inglott (April 26, 1936 – March 16, 2012) wrote the following regarding Riolo and his work:

"[...] what I am most proud of is the textbook on logic written by Vincent Riolo.

"Riolo's contribution to the development of what might be called dialogic logic (or Constructivist Logic) is the most powerful building brick supplied by a fellow [Maltese] countryman of ours to the edifice of philosophy. Of course it is almost impossible for students familiar with neither classic Aristotelian nor modern Fregean logic to appreciate the finesse of the material they are privileged to study, in contrast with the rubbish that my generation were taught [...]."

Riolo's publications include:

- 1995 – Introduction to Logic.(Malta University Publishers).
- 1997 – Logical Dialogue.
- 2013 – Scenario Tableaux.

== See also ==
- Philosophy in Malta

== Sources ==
- Mark Montebello, Il-Ktieb tal-Filosofija f’Malta (A Source Book of Philosophy in Malta), PIN Publications, Malta, 2001.
- Peter Serracino Inglott, 'Want a Job? Try Philosophy', in The Sunday Times of Malta, August 31, 2008.
