= Leonardo Moledo =

Argentine writer and philosopher

Leonardo Moledo (February 20, 1947 – August 9, 2014) was an Argentine writer and philosopher.

== Life and work ==
Leonardo Moledo (left) and Enrique Chaparro host a symposium on "knowledge as a social asset and the Library of Babel" during Wikimania 2009, in Buenos Aires.

Leonardo Moledo was born in Buenos Aires, in 1947. He enrolled at the public secondary school, the National College of Buenos Aires. He was accepted into the University of Buenos Aires, where he received a degree from the School of Natural and Exact Sciences.

Moledo was later a research fellow at the National Research Council, during which time he earned a History Degree at the University of Buenos Aires. He wrote his first novel La mala guita (Dirty Money) in 1976 and in 1985, Verídico informe sobre la ciudad de Bree (True Report on the City of Bree). That year, he premiered his first play, Las reglas del juego (The Rules of the Game) at the important San Martín Cultural Centre. He premiered his only other published play, El regreso al hogar (Returning Home), in 1987.

Moledo became well known among local readers for his tales of science fiction, which were regularly published in magazines popular among young readers (El Péndulo and Minotauro), as well as in the cultural sections of leading Buenos Aires dailies such as Clarín and Página/12. Some of the most notable among these articles were Agenda Científica and Un viaje por el universo (A Journey Through the Universe). He also hosted Ciencia y Conciencia (Science and Conscience), a television program on the subject which aired on the public Channel 13, in 1989. The popularity of his articles led Moledo to begin writing books of cognitive science, which he viewed as "furthering science, by other means."

Since 1995, Moledo has authored numerous books in that genre, including:

- De las Tortugas a las estrellas (From Tortoises to the Stars, 1995)
- La evolución (Evolution, 1995)
- El Big Bang (1995)
- Dioses y demonios en el átomo (Gods and Demons in the Atom, 1996)
- Curiosidades del Planeta Tierra (Curiosities of Planet Earth, 1997)
- La relatividad del movimiento (The Relativity of Movement, 1997)
- Curiosidades de la ciencia (Curiosities of Science, 2000)
- Diez teorías que conmovieron al mundo (Ten Theories that Shook the World - volumes I and II, with Esteban Magnani, 2006)
- El café de los científicos, sobre Dios y otros debates (The Scientists' Café: On God and Other Debates, with Martín de Ambrosio, 2006)
- El café de los científicos, de Einstein a la clonación (The Scientists' Café: From Einstein to Cloning, with Martín de Ambrosio, 2007)
- La leyenda de las estrellas (The Legend of the Stars, 2007)
- Lavar los platos (Back to the Drawing Board, with Ignacio Jawtuschenko, 2008)
- Los mitos de la ciencia (Myths of Science, 2008).

Moledo was honored a Konex Award (the highest in the Argentine cultural realm) in 1994 as the Best Writer in Argentine Science Fiction, and in 1997 as the Man of the Decade in Argentine Journalism. He was appointed Director of the Buenos Aires Planetarium, in 2000. He served in that capacity until 2007, while also teaching at the Universities of Buenos Aires, Quilmes and Entre Ríos. He continues to teach and contribute opinion columns in Página/12.

On his interest in science as a philosopher, Moledo once stated that:

Science is a great story that mankind tells itself about the world, and that the world tells us about ourselves. It is to me as powerful and beautiful as any myth. To think that universe began with a great explosion, deploying itself in gases that became stars - and that they, in turn, became other stars. This is the stuff of myths.
