= Event (philosophy) =

Occurrence of objects or instances

In philosophy, events are particulars in time or instantiations of properties in objects. On some views, only changes involving the acquisition or loss of a property can constitute events, like the lawn becoming dry. According to others, there are also events that involve nothing but the retaining of a property, e.g. the lawn staying wet. Events are usually defined as particulars that, unlike universals, cannot be instantiated repeatedly. Processes are often understood as complex events constituted by sequences of events. But even simple events can be conceived as complex entities involving an object, a time and the property exemplified by the object at this time. Some traditional metaphysical approaches tended to emphasize static being over dynamic events. This tendency has been opposed by so-called process philosophy or process ontology, which ascribes ontological primacy to events and processes.

== Kim’s property-exemplification ==
Jaegwon Kim theorized that events are structured.
They are composed of three things:

1. object(s) $[x]$,
2. a property $[P]$ and
3. time or a temporal interval $[t]$.

Events are defined using the operation $[x, P, t]$.
A unique event is defined by two principles:

a) the existence condition and
b) the identity condition.

The existence condition states “$[x, P, t]$ exists if and only if object $x$ exemplifies the $n$-adic $P$ at time $t$.” This means a unique event exists if the above is met. The identity condition states “$[x, P, t]$ is $[y, Q, t']$ if and only if $x=y$, $P=Q$ and $t=t'$.”

Kim uses these to define events under five conditions:

1. One, they are unrepeatable, unchangeable particulars that include changes and the states and conditions of that event.
2. Two, they have a semi-temporal location.
3. Three, only their constructive property creates distinct events.
4. Four, holding a constructive property as a generic event creates a type-token relationship between events, and events are not limited to their three requirements (i.e. $[x, P, t]$). Critics of this theory such as Myles Brand have suggested that the theory be modified so that an event had a spatiotemporal region; consider the event of a flash of lightning. The idea is that an event must include both the span of time of the flash of lightning and the area in which it occurred.

Other problems exist within Kim's theory, as he never specified what properties were (e.g. universals, tropes, natural classes, etc.). In addition, it is not specified if properties are few or abundant. The following is Kim's response to the above.

. . . [T]he basic generic events may be best picked out relative to a scientific theory, whether the theory is a common-sense theory of the behavior of middle-sized objects or a highly sophisticated physical theory. They are among the important properties, relative to the theory, in terms of which lawful regularities can be discovered, described, and explained. The basic parameters in terms of which the laws of the theory are formulated would, on this view, give us our basic generic events, and the usual logical, mathematical, and perhaps other types of operations on them would yield complex, defined generic events. We commonly recognize such properties as motion, colors, temperatures, weights, pushing, and breaking, as generic events and states, but we must view this against the background of our common-sense explanatory and predictive scheme of the world around us. I think it highly likely that we cannot pick out generic events completely a priori.

There is also a major debate about the essentiality of a constitutive object. There are two major questions involved in this: If one event occurs, could it have occurred in the same manner if it were another person, and could it occur in the same manner if it would have occurred at a different time? Kim holds that neither are true and that different conditions (i.e. a different person or time) would lead to a separate event. However, some consider it natural to assume the opposite.

== Davidson ==
Donald Davidson and John Lemmon proposed a theory of events that had two major conditions, respectively: a causal criterion and a spatiotemporal criterion.

The causal criterion defines an event as two events being the same if and only if they have the same cause and effect.

The spatiotemporal criterion defines an event as two events being the same if and only if they occur in the same space at the same time. Davidson however provided this scenario; if a metal ball becomes warmer during a certain minute, and during the same minute rotates through 35 degrees, must we say that these are the same event? However, one can argue that the warming of the ball and the rotation are possibly temporally separated and are therefore separate events.

== Lewis ==
David Lewis theorized that events are merely spatiotemporal regions and properties (i.e. membership of a class). He defines an event as "e is an event only if it is a class of spatiotemporal regions, both thisworldly (assuming it occurs in the actual world) and otherworldly." The only problem with this definition is it only tells us what an event could be, but does not define a unique event. This theory entails modal realism, which assumes possible worlds exist; worlds are defined as sets containing all objects that exist as a part of that set. However, this theory is controversial. Some philosophers have attempted to remove possible worlds, and reduce them to other entities. They hold that the world we exist in is the only world that actually exists, and that possible worlds are only possibilities.

Lewis’ theory is composed of four key points. Firstly, the non-duplication principle; it states that x and y are separate events if and only if there is one member of x that is not a member of y (or vice versa). Secondly, there exist regions that are subsets of possible worlds and thirdly, events are not structured by an essential time.

== Deleuze ==
Gilles Deleuze lectured on the concept of event on March 10, 1987. A sense of the lecture is described by James Williams. Williams also wrote, "From the point of view of the difference between two possible worlds, the event is all important". He also stated, "Every event is revolutionary due to an integration of signs, acts and structures through the whole event. Events are distinguished by the intensity of this revolution, rather than the types of freedom or chance." In 1988 Deleuze published a magazine article "Signes et événements".

In his book Nietszche and Philosophy, he addresses the question "Which one is beautiful?" In the preface to the English translation he wrote:

The one that ... does not refer to an individual, to a person, but rather to an event, that is, to the forces in their various relationships to a proposition or phenomenon, and the genetic relationship that determines these forces (power).

== Badiou ==
In Being and Event, Alain Badiou writes that the event (événement) is a multiple which basically does not make sense according to the rules of the "situation," in other words existence. Hence, the event "is not," and therefore, in order for there to be an event, there must be an "intervention" which changes the rules of the situation in order to allow that particular event to be. ("To be", meaning, to be a multiple which belongs to the multiple of the situation — these terms are drawn from or defined in reference to set theory.) In his view, there is no "one," and everything that is is a "multiple." "One" happens when the situation "counts," or accounts for, acknowledges, or defines something: it "counts it as one." For the event to be counted as one by the situation, or counted in the one of the situation, an intervention needs to decide its belonging to the situation. This is because his definition of the event violates the prohibition against self-belonging (in other words, it is a set-theoretical definition which violates set theory's rules of consistency), thus does not count as extant on its own.

== Kirkeby ==
The Danish philosopher Ole Fogh Kirkeby deserves mentioning, as he has written a comprehensive trilogy about the event, or in Danish "begivenheden". In the first work of the trilogy "Eventum tantum – begivenhedens ethos" (Eventum tantum - the ethos of the event) he distinguishes between three levels of the event, inspired from Nicholas of Cusa: Eventum tantum as non aliud, the alma-event and the proto-event.

== See also ==
- Free play (Derrida)
- Happening – Type of performance artwork
- Philosophy of space and time
