= Léon Robin =

French philosopher (1866–1947)

Léon Robin (Nantes, 17 January 1866 – July 1947) was a French philosopher and scholar of Greek philosophy, professor of history of ancient philosophy at the Sorbonne from 1924 to 1936.

Robin, the son of a merchant, began teaching in the Faculty of Letters at Paris in 1913. In 1924 he took up the chair of history of ancient philosophy, which had lapsed after the death of Louis Rodier in 1913. In 1927 he was visiting professor at the University of Pennsylvania. On his retirement from the Paris chair, his successor was Pierre-Maxime Schuhl. Robin subsequently served as Director of the International Institute of Philosophy.

Léon Robin translated the dialogues of Plato into French.

== Biography ==
The son of a merchant, Léon Eglée Eugène Robin attended high school at the Lycée de Nantes and then at the Lycée Charlemagne.

He studied at the Faculty of Letters in Bordeaux and then at the Sorbonne. He earned a bachelor’s degree in literature in 1887 and ranked sixth on the agrégation exam in philosophy in 1891. He earned his doctorate in literature in 1908 upon the defense of his dissertations, the main one of which, The Platonic Theory of Ideas and Numbers According to Aristotle, was published by Félix Alcan.

He married Marie Counord, the daughter of a schoolteacher, in 1891; she died in 1955 in Paris (13th arrondissement). He had two daughters. One married Robert Jardillier, a minister and teacher from Marseille, and the other married Joseph Pérès, a teacher and researcher.

== Works ==
- La théorie platonicienne des idées et des nombres d'après Aristote; étude historique et critique, 1908
- La théorie platonicienne de l'amour, 1908
- (transl. and ed.) Plato, Oeuvres complètes, 1920
- La pensée grecque et les origines de l'esprit scientifique, 1923. English translation, Greek thought and the origins of the scientific spirit, 1928
- La morale antique, 1938
- Pyrrhon et le scepticisme grec, 1944
