= Marcel Foucault =

French philosopher and psychologist (1865–1947)

- Born: 4 August 1865
- Died: 7 October 1947
- Occupations: Psychologist, philosopher, university teacher
- Awards: Chevalier of the Legion of Honour

Marcel Foucault (1865–1947) was a French philosopher and psychologist.

Marcel Foucault was professor of philosophy at the University of Montpellier. In 1906 he founded a laboratory of experimental psychology at the university.

== Works ==
- Ls psycho-physique, F. Alcan, 1901
- Observations et experiences de Psychologie scolaire, 1910
- L'illusion paradoxale et le seuil de Weber, Montpellier: Coulet et fils, 1910
- Cours de psychologie, F. Alcan, 1926
