= Jadwiga Szczawińska-Dawidowa =

Polish educator, writer, and feminist (1864–1910)

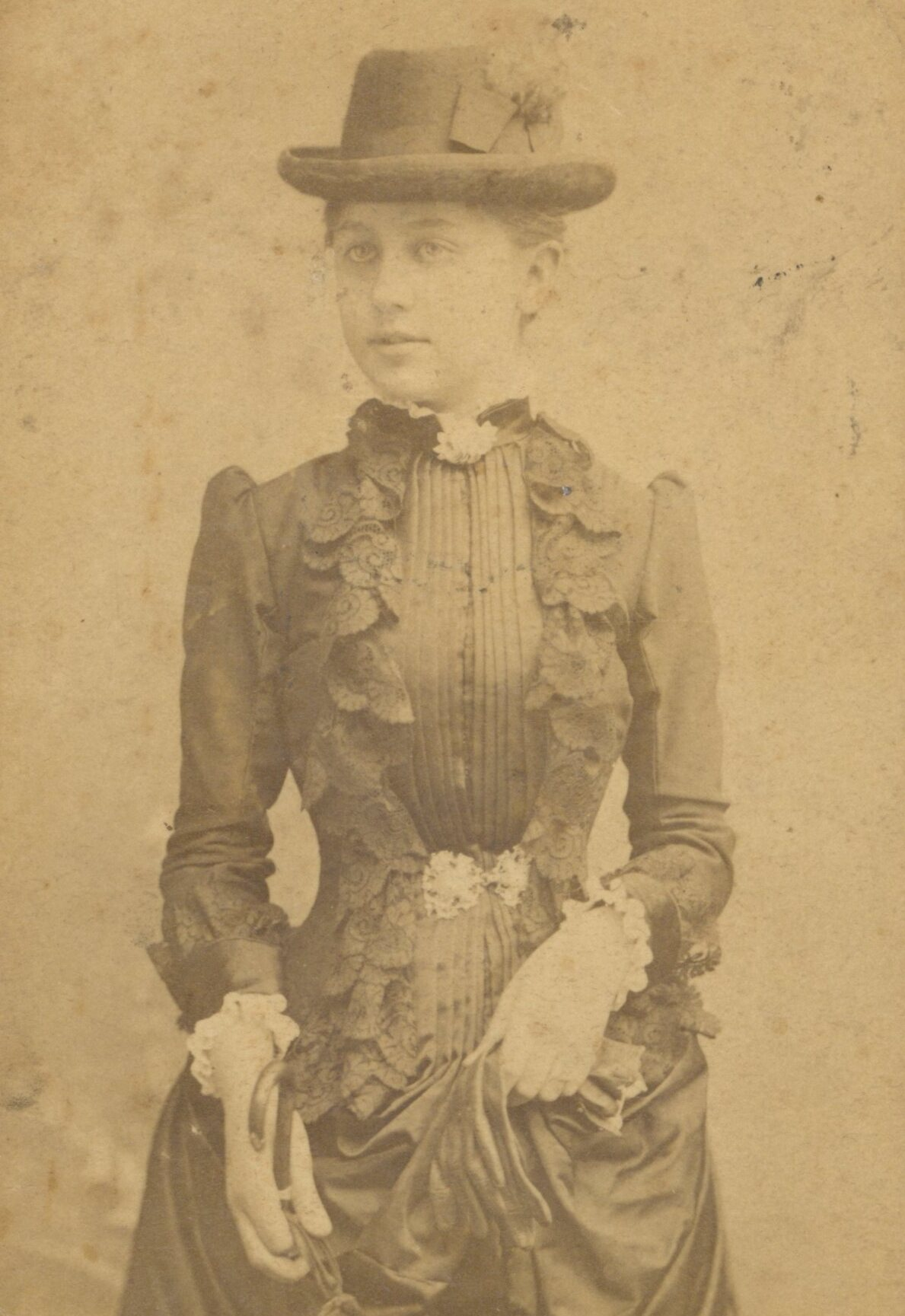
- Szczawińska circa 1878, by Jan Mieczkowski
- Born: Jadwiga Maria Szczawińska; 6 October 1864; Warsaw, Congress Poland, Russian Empire
- Died: 26 February 1910 (aged 45); Rokosz near Góra Kalwaria, Congress Poland
- Other name: Jadwiga Szczawińska
- Occupations: Educator, women's rights activist
- Years active: 1880–1910
- Relatives: Gustaw Stefan Szczawiński (brother); Wanda Szczawińska (sister)

Jadwiga Szczawińska-Dawidowa (6 October 1864 – 26 February 1910) was a Polish teacher, school founder, writer and women's rights activist. She founded the underground Flying University to provide women with higher education and was the initiator of the efforts to found the Warsaw Public Library. Along with her husband, she founded cultural and educational periodicals and served as both a columnist and editor for the journals until her death.

== Early life ==
Jadwiga Maria Szczawińska was born on 6 October 1864 at 16 Świętojańska Street in Warsaw to Bronisława Natalia (née Gumpricht, aka Gumbrycht) and Wojciech Albert Szczawiński. Her mother was the daughter of a Warsaw hatter and her father, descended from an impoverished family which bore the Prawdzic coat of arms was employed in the administrative service of the police department. Szczawińska was the eldest of four children and her siblings included Wandę Marię (1866–1955), who would later be a physician; Helena Zofia (1872–1931), who would become the first wife of the composer Henryk Melcer-Szczawiński; and Gustaw Stefan (1874–1937), later a writer and businessman. Szczawińska graduated from the Warsaw Women's Gymnasium in 1880, taking the gold medal for her class. She went on to take her teacher's examination and earned the right to teach in middle school.

== Career ==
Though Szczawińska was hired to teach for several years at the Second National Feminine Junior High School, she flouted the Russification law which forbade teaching the Polish language in Congress Poland (then subjugated by Imperial Russia). Her defiant nature caused her termination from her post and she began offering private lessons from her home to prepare girls for their exams. Simultaneously, she founded a school in Tokary to teach peasant women how to make basketry. In 1884, she met Jan Władysław Dawid, who was lecturing at clandestine courses. At the time, because the Russian law prohibited a traditional Polish education, which included courses in Catholicism, Polish history, and the Polish language, teachers like Dawid, who wanted to preserve their Polish heritage had to teach in underground circles.

The following year, Szczawińska founded the Uniwersytetu Latającego (Flying University), so named because the school strategically changed locations often to avoid the tsarist police, to offer university courses to women, though men also could attend. Classes were held in private homes and students were cautioned to stagger their arrival times to avoid detection of the gatherings. Monthly pupils paid 2–4 rubles per subject for instruction from professors, most of whom had previously taught at the University of Warsaw. Included in the faculty were Odo Bujwid, the first Polish bacteriologist; Piotr Chmielowski, a literary historian; Ludwik Krzywicki, an economist and sociologist; and Władysław Smoleński, a professor of Polish history. Some of the schools' most noted students were Nobel prizewinner Marie Curie, educator Janusz Korczak, and writer Zofia Nałkowska.

Szczawińska headed the Board of the school but came into conflict with other members over whether the school's funding should be spent on social programs or public education. She favored training scholars to be social activists as well as pedagogists, but many on the board differed with her approach and stern manner. These conflicts came to a head during the 1889–1890 term, with the faction led by Bronisławą Gutmanówną resigning to form a rival institution. During this same time, on 14 July 1889, Szczawińska and Jan Władysław Dawid married at St. Alexander's Church, Warsaw. Though very different in temperament — he was described by Nałkowska as inattentive, unkempt, and "never smiling", while "she was talkative and full of life" — they shared a passion for social improvement, science, and an independent, liberated Poland.

Dawidowa began working as a journalist, publishing in such journals as Głos (The Voice) and Przeglądzie Społecznym (Social Review), using various pseudonyms, including Jotes, Wojciech Kłos, J. S.D., and J. Sz. In 1890, she published Kółka rolnicze w Galicji (Agricultural Circles in Galicia), about public education in rural areas. She was especially concerned with social issues writing about topics, among others, such as inadequate funding for student education, poor wages and working conditions for women, women's suffrage, and youth suicide. That same year, Dawidowa led the drive to establish a public library in Warsaw, founding a reading room that offered scientific journals. Three years later, she established a second reading room, inviting scholars to donate materials from their private collections. Within a few months, 6,000 volumes were acquired. To facilitate workers, she ensured that the library was open from 10 o'clock in the morning until 1 a.m. and wrote articles to raise funds to keep it open and maintain the reading room.

In 1894, tsarist police raided the couple's home and arrested them both for their activities with the Flying University. They were confined in the Tenth Pavilion of the Warsaw Citadel and held for a week. Upon their release, they returned to their journalistic and educational endeavors with Dawidowa publishing an article, O potrzebie założenia publicznej bibliote-ki w Warszawie (On the Need To Set up a Public Library in Warsaw, 1897) in Pedagogical Review and in 1900 with her publication of Wojciech Kłos. Historia pożytecznego człowieka (Wojciech Kłos: The Story of a Useful Man). At the same time as the latter publication, Dawid took over as editor-in-chief of Glos and Dawidowa was put in charge of organizational and marketing administration for the magazine. In 1905, when the Polish Revolution failed, her husband was ordered to leave Poland and fled to Vienna, Dawidowa took over as editor of Głos from March through June and sent money to Dawid for his financial support, as his health was in decline. In June, authorities suspended the journal's operations.

Though some 5,000 students had graduated from Flying University, in 1906, Dawidowa withdrew from the board, when it was allowed to legalize its operations as the Towarzystwa Kursów Naukowych (Association of Scientific Courses). She and her husband began working as editors of Przegląd Społeczny (Social Review) that same year and then in 1907, switched to the journal Społeczeństwo (Society), where Dawidowa continued to write about social issues and education. Through 1910, she published over 30 articles and manuscripts in journals for which she worked as editor and others, like Przeglądzie Tygodniowym Życia Społecznego (Weekly Review of Social Life), Literatury i Sztuk Pięknych (Literature and Fine Arts), and Przeglądzie Pedagogicznym (Pedagogical Review).

== Death and legacy ==
Suffering from depression and exhaustion, in 1910, Dawidowa was urged by friends to take time away at the village of Rokosz near Góra Kalwaria. There on 26 February 1910, she committed suicide by throwing herself down a concrete well. After the funeral service, which was held in the cathedral in which the couple were married, she was buried in Powązki Cemetery. Her husband, who was anguished by her death, moved to Kraków in 1912 and prematurely died four years after she did.

Dawidowa is recognized as a pioneer of women's education and empowerment in Poland. The letters exchanged by the couple during their lifetimes were deposited in 1915 at the Department of Old Prints and Manuscripts at the Warsaw Public Library, after Dawid's death. The library hosted an exhibition, Schodząca w otchłań (Descending into the Abyss), in honor of Szczawińska-Dawidowa's work to establish the first public library in Warsaw, on her 150th birthday in 2014. In 2017, a study, Jadwigi Szczawińska-Dawidowej Listy do Jana Władysława Dawida: (marzec – kwiecień – maj 1905) (Jadwiga Szczawińska-Dawidowa's Letters to Jan Władysław Dawid: (March – April – May 1905)) analyzing some the letters of the Dawids was published and an exhibit in their honor was hosted for the library's 110th anniversary.
