= Sapphic stanza in Polish poetry =

Adaptation of the Sapphic stanza for the Polish language

The Sapphic stanza is the only stanzaic form adapted from Greek and Latin poetry to be used widely in Polish literature. It was introduced during the Renaissance, and since has been used frequently by many prominent poets. The importance of the Sapphic stanza for Polish literature lies not only in its frequent use, but also in the fact that it formed the basis of many new strophes, built up of hendecasyllables (11-syllable lines) and pentasyllables (5-syllable lines).

== Metrical components ==
=== Classical models ===
The stanza comes from classical Greece, but it was the Romans, especially Horace, who provided the chief models for Renaissance poets. Horace's Sapphic stanza comprised three "lesser sapphics" and an "adonic":

– u – x – u u – u – –
– u – x – u u – u – –
– u – x – u u – u – –
– u u – –

– = long syllable; u = short syllable; x = anceps: either long or short

=== Polish verse ===
In Polish there was no quantitative verse, as phonemic quantity itself was extinct. Nor was there accentual-syllabic versification, save some attempts by Jan Kochanowski. But Polish syllabic lines were available. A syllabic hendecasyllable 11(5+6) took the place of the quantitative lesser sapphic; likewise with the adonic.

Quantitative Lesser Sapphic:      – u – x –   u u – u – –
Syllabic Polish Hendecasyllable:  o o o S s | o o o o S s

Quantitative Adonic:   – u u – –
Polish Pentasyllable:  o o o S s

o = any syllable; S = stressed syllable; s = unstressed syllable; | = caesura

The hendecasyllable (with caesura after the fifth syllable) is very common in Polish poetry, and the pentasyllable is so typical for Polish verse that Karol Wiktor Zawodziński gave it the name of polonik. Pentasyllables occur in Polish poetry either in a long series of corresponding lines, or in combination with other metrical lines. They can also form a part-line within the metrical patterns of longer lines, such as: 8(5+3), 9(5+4), 10(5+5), 11(5+6), 12(5+7), 12(7+5), 13(8+5), and even 15(5+5+5) and 20(5+5+5+5).

== The Renaissance ==
The Renaissance was the epoch when Polish literature became a great one. Polish poets of the time were well educated, mainly in Italy, knew Latin and sometimes Greek, and worked hard on building a new Polish literature. Many authors wrote in Latin, while some tried to create a modern Polish literary language. As in other European literatures, Polish poets often looked to Greek and Roman literature as a model. Jan Kochanowski, the most prominent of a family of poets, wrote lyrical poems, often in imitation of Horace.

The classic Polish Sapphic stanza was thus 11(5+6) / 11(5+6) / 11(5+6) / 5, typically rhymed AABB. Jan Kochanowski used this Sapphic stanza several times in his Cantos, Laments, and Psalms. An excellent example is Lament XVI.

Nieszczęściu kwoli a swojej żałości,
Która mię prawie przejmuje do kości,
Lutnią i wdzięczny rym porzucić muszę,
Ledwe nie duszę.

— Stanza 1
Translation:

Since my misfortunes and my daily sorrow
Pervade my body, pricking to the marrow,
My lute lies silent, my fair rhymes forsaken—
My soul, too, shaken.

Mikołaj Sęp-Szarzyński, who was the author of Rymy, abo wiersze polskie (The rhymes or Polish poems) and Sebastian Grabowiecki, who was the author of Setnik rymów duchownych (Spiritual Rhymes) also used Sapphic stanzas in their lyrical pieces. Sebastian Fabian Klonowic (known as Acernus) decided to employ the stanza in a longer epic poem. His Flis, to Jest Spuszczanie Statków Wisłą i inszymi rzekami (The lightening or expediting barges on the Vistula river and other rivers) is because of its stanzaic form an exceptional work, perhaps not only in Polish literature.

Bóg na początku gdy niebo i ziemię
Stworzył i morze i żywych dusz plemię,
Rozdzielił Chaos na cztery osady
Z swej boskiej rady.

— Stanza 24
Translation:

When the God in the beginning created
Heaven and earth, the sea and all living beings,
He divided chaos into the four elements
With his divine decision.

The whole poem is 471 stanzas long and probably no other work can be compared to it. Tobiasz Wiszniowski, who wrote his own sequence of Laments, employed Sapphic stanza in Tren XVII (Lament XVII).

== The Baroque ==
At the beginning of the Baroque, Kasper Miaskowski employed the Sapphic stanza in some poems. Olbrycht Karmanowski, a minor poet, employed it in the poem O śmierci (On Death). Lenart Gnoiński used Sapphic stanzas in the tenth poem of a sequence named Łzy smutne (Sorrowful Tears). Daniel Naborowski, a Calvinist poet, employed the Sapphic stanza in Lament I from Laments on Death of Duke Radziwiłł, Castellan of Vilnius. The poem consists of eleven strophes. Jan Andrzej Morsztyn, whose poetry (influenced strongly by Giambattista Marino) is most typical for Baroque, used Sappho's stanza in Do lutnie (To a Lute) from Lutnia (The Lute) and in Wiejski żywot (Life in a Village from the book Kanikuła, albo psia gwiazda (Canicula or dog star). Zbigniew Morsztyn shaped his Sapphic stanzas so as to make a long chain of linked strophes, exhibiting many enjambments from one to the next stanza. He is the author of the poem Sławna wiktoryja nad Turkami (The Famous Victory over the Turks), which is an example of the use of the Sapphic stanza in an epic function. Large parts of Klemens Bolesławiusz's Przeraźliwe echo trąby ostatecznej (The Horrifying Echo of Doomsday Trumpet) are composed in Sapphic stanzas. This work, which can be compared to The Revelation of St. John or Dante Alighieri's Divine Comedy, was extremely popular and appeared in eighteen editions from 1670 to 1886. It is another example of the Sapphic stanza serving an epic function in Old Polish literature.

== The Enlightenment ==
The Sapphic stanza was also used in Poland during Enlightenment. Poets of the time preferred the Polish alexandrine (7+6) to the hendecasyllable (5+6), but used the latter metre in Italian forms, such as sesta rima and ottava rima, as well as in Sappho's stanza. Sapphic stanzas can be found in Adam Naruszewicz's poetry. He used the form among others in the poem Pieśń doroczna na dzień ocalenia życia i zdrowia J. K. Mości (Annual song for the day of rescuing life and health of His Majesty, the King). He also employed it in the poem "Piesek" ("A little dog"). Franciszek Karpiński made use of the analysed form in Psalm 8. O wielkości Boga (Psalm 8. On God's grandeur). He repeated it in the Psalmu 64 część. O opatrzności (Part of Psalm 64. On Providence) and in the poem Pieśń do świętych Polaków, patronów Polski (Hymn to the holy Poles, patrons of Poland). Another poet, Franciszek Dionizy Kniaźnin used Sappho's stanza very frequently. Another example of Sapphic stanza is a hymn included in Gorzkie żale (Bitter Lamentations), a typically Polish Catholic devotion, sung in churches on Sundays during Lent, and familiar to many Poles.

Żal duszę ściska, serce boleść czuje,
Gdy słodki Jezus na śmierć się gotuje;
Klęczy w Ogrójcu, gdy krwawy pot leje,
Me serce mdleje.

Translation:

Grief squeezes soul, and the heart feels pain,
When sweet Jesus is preparing for death
Kneeling in Gethsemane, when the bloody sweat pours,
My heart faints.

== Romanticism ==
Neither Adam Mickiewicz nor Juliusz Słowacki used the classic Sapphic stanza. Słowacki, however, employed its general scheme in his own six-line stanza, discussed below. Cyprian Kamil Norwid, a poet regarded as one of the greatest Polish authors and perhaps the most modern of the poets of the 19th century, used Sapphic stanzas in the poem named Trzy zwrotki (Three strophes), as well as in many other poems including Sieroctwo (Orphanhood). Sometimes he implemented the scheme freely, as in the poem Buntowniki (Rioters).

== Second half of the 19th century ==
The second half of the 19th century in Polish literature was dominated by pozytywizm (positivism), which was the local Polish version of West-European realism. The two greatest poets of the time were Adam Asnyk and Maria Konopnicka. Their poetry was much influenced by French Parnassianism.

Maria Konopnicka published more than twenty poems written in the form. She also used its scheme for constructing more complicated stanzas. Felicjan Faleński attempted a Polish Sapphic stanza more closely resembling the Greek and Latin models, and in translating Horace's poetry used a hendecasyllable with the caesura after the fourth, not the fifth syllable. His Sapphic stanzas influenced the Czech poet Jaroslav Vrchlický. Also Kazimierz Wroczyński tried to imitate Greek rhythm in his poem Strofa Safony (Sappho's strophe). His stanza is composed of three lines of SsSsSsSSsSs and one of SssSs. The SsSsSsSSsSs scheme is just a trochaic hexameter (SsSsSsSsSsSs) with the eighth syllable omitted. For comparison to Horace's standard:

Horace:      – u – x – u u – u – –
Wroczyński:  S s S s S s S S s S s (×3)

Horace:      – u u – –
Wroczyński:  S s s S s

== 20th century ==
In the 20th century classic strophes went out of use together with regular verse. Jarosław Iwaszkiewicz used Sapphic stanza in the poem Marzec w Paryżu (March in Paris). It is composed of four stanzas and three are Sapphic ones. Only the last one is made up of four hendecasyllabic lines. All strophes rhyme ABAB. The Sapphic stanza is still used in translations form Sappho's or Horace's poems. The scheme of Sapphic stanza is so recognizable, that it can be preserved even in free verse. Lucylla Pszczołowska points out that Czesław Miłosz sometimes composed four-line stanzas with last line of five syllables and other lines of different length.

== Other forms derived from the Sapphic stanza ==
The Sapphic stanza's scheme was so attractive to Polish poets that they started to modify it, and many stanzas based on it can be found in Polish literature. Already in the 16th century Jan Kochanowski created a three-line stanza, being just a shortened Sapphic stanza (11/11/5), and used it in his Psalm 34. Much later Kochanowski's proposal was used by Cyprian Kamil Norwid in his famous poem Coś ty Atenom zrobił, Sokratesie? (What Did You Do to Athens, Socrates?) Juliusz Słowacki, a romantic poet, frequently used a sexain rhyming ABABCC, and invented a stanza using this rhyme scheme but suggesting the Sapphic stanza in its metre: 11a/11b/11a/5b/11c/5c.

Smutno mi Boże! Dla mnie na zachodzie
Rozlałeś tęczę blasków promienistą,
Przede mną gasisz w lazurowej wodzie
Gwiazdę ognistą,
Choć mi tak niebo ty złocisz i morze,
Smutno mi Boże!

Translation:

I am so sad, O God! Thou hast before me
Spread a bright rainbow in the western skies,
But thou hast quenched in darkness cold and stormy
The brighter stars that rise;
Clear grows the heaven ’neath thy transforming rod:
Still I am sad, O God!

— Translated by Paul Soboleski

It is also possible that Słowacki was inspired by the well-known Burns stanza which also consists of four longer lines (iambic tetrameters) and two shorter (iambic dimeters):

But Mousie, thou art no thy-lane,
In proving foresight may be vain:
The best laid schemes o’ Mice an’ Men
Gang aft agley,
An’ lea’e us nought but grief an’ pain,
For promis’d joy!

Maria Konopnicka used Słowacki's stanza in her well-known poem with the Latin title "Contra spem spero", and in the poems "Do ziemi" ("To the soil") and in "Zima do poety" ("Winter to the poet"). In another poem, "Jej pamięci" ("To her memory"), she employed a very similar strophe, also 11/11/11/5/11/5, but rhymed AABBCC. In the lyric "Preludium" ("Prelude") she employed a seven-line stanza, built in much the same way: 11a/11b/11a/11a/5b/11c/5c. Once again she suggested Sappho's stanzaic pattern in the poem "Posłom wielkopolskim" ("To the deputies from the Greater Poland"), which goes 11a/11b/11a/5b/11c/11c; she repeated this scheme in "Improwizacja" ("Improvisation") and in "Ave, Patria". In the poem "Idź, idź w pokoju!" ("Go away in peace") Konopnicka used a six-line strophe 5a/11b/11b/11c/11c/5a. Another form used by Konopnicka suggestive of the Sapphic stanza is a quatrain composed of three hendecasyllabic lines and one trisyllable, used in "Kto krzywdę płodzi" ("Who begets harm"). More complicated is an eight-line stanza 11/11/11/5/11/11/11/3 (rhymed ABABCCAB), as was employed in the "W Porta Pia" ("In Porta Pia"). Another form developed by Konopnicka is the five-line strophe including decasyllabic lines and masculine rhymes: 10m/5f/10m/10m/5f, used in "Którzy idziemy" ("We that are going").

Adam Asnyk wrote an epigram (Italian strambotto) "Ironia" ("Irony") in the form of ottava rima with the last line being a pentasyllable. He also often combined octosyllables with a pentasyllable, making a quasi-Sapphic stanza of 8/8/8/5. He was not the first poet to use such a stanza, being preceded by Franciszek Dionizy Kniaźnin and by the Romantic poet Kazimierz Brodziński. There are also more unusual forms. Jerzy Szlichting, a poet from 17th century, in his Pieśń (Song) made Sapphic-like strophe 13(8+5)a/13(8+5)a/16(8b+8b)/5x. It is an example of stanza with internal rhymes. The strophe is built of segments of five or eight syllables.
