= Underground education in Poland =

Underground education in Poland may refer to:

- Education in Poland during World War II
- Flying University, an underground educational enterprise that operated from 1885 to 1905 and from 1977 to 1981
