= Mieczysław Hertz =

Polish merchant, historian, writer

- Born: January 2, 1870; Warsaw
- Died: January 18, 1943 (aged 73); Warsaw
- Education: Riga Technical University
- Occupations: merchant, historian, writer
- Spouse: Maria née Maybaum (c. 1901–1918 or 1920)
- Children: Zygmunt Hertz, Aniela Hertz (Olszewska)
- Parents: Maksymilian (Monas) Hertz (father); Paulina née Lande (mother)
- Honours: Order of Polonia Restituta

Mieczysław Hertz (born 2 January 1870 in Warsaw, died 18 January 1943 in the same city) was a Polish merchant, historian, writer, and economic, social, and municipal activist tied to Łódź. He authored memoirs on World War I in Łódź and was the father of Zygmunt Hertz, co-founder of the Paris-based magazine Kultura. Hertz was a victim of the Holocaust.

== Biography ==
=== Early life and education ===
Hertz hailed from an assimilated Jewish family in Warsaw. His father, Maksymilian (Monas) Hertz, a Warsaw Rabbinical School graduate, was a doctor linked to the Polish Socialist Party – Left, famed for raising 80,000 rubles for the orphanage at 92 Krochmalna Street, run by Janusz Korczak and Stefania Wilczyńska. Mieczysław attended gymnasiums in Warsaw and Tartu (then Derpt). From 1890, he studied at the Riga Technical University's Commercial Faculty, graduating in 1894. He joined the Arkonia academic corporation in 1890 (registration number 461). Wiesław Puś suggests he also studied at Berlin's Higher School of Economics, though this lacks a completion date or corroboration.

=== Early years in Łódź ===
Hertz settled in Łódź in 1892 after his studies, establishing a trading office. Paweł Spodenkiewicz, a sociologist from the Łódź branch of the Institute of National Remembrance, suggests family ties influenced this move – Hertz was related to Leonia Poznańska née Hertz, wife of cotton magnate Izrael Poznański, and her son-in-law Jakub Hertz.

On 1 January 1899, with Alfred Biedermann, Juliusz Teodor Heinzel, and A. Laub, he co-founded the Warrant Joint-Stock Company, active until 1938. It managed warehouses (at Targowa and Wodna streets), financed cotton purchases, and handled goods transport, providing free space to the City Provisioning Section during World War I. He also served on the Suchedniów Foundry Joint-Stock Company's board.

Beyond commerce, Hertz pursued artistic interests. In 1901, he entered his dramatic fairy tale Ananke in the Henryk Sienkiewicz Drama Competition, announced by Rozwój between September and October to mark the Old Grand Theater's opening by Fryderyk Sellin. Henryk Sienkiewicz, the patron, judged entries and donated 100 rubles for prizes. On 12 February 1903, among 87 submissions, Ananke earned a distinction. The jury, finding no "absolutely outstanding" work, nearly awarded it the 1,000-ruble prize, deeming Hertz a "serious artist".

Ananke premiered in 1903 at Łódź's Victoria Theater (67 Piotrkowska Street). It was staged in Warsaw – where audiences were tepid, though Władysław Bogusławski praised it as a "beautiful work" – and Lviv.

Buoyed by this, Hertz wrote Lubczyk, a four-act dramatic fairy tale, premiering on 21 January 1905 at Łódź's Old Grand Theater (14 Konstantynowska Street, now Legionów Street). Critic Stanisław Łąpiński wrote in Rozwój:

After Ananke, we expected something powerful from Mr. Mieczysław Hertz, a work marking his talent's growth. Yet Lubczyk is weaker, lacking action and dramatic conflict, saved only by a few cleverly conceived situations [...]. Correct language, colorful style, nature's sensitivity, and poetic comparisons are Lubczyk's sole merits, unlikely to ensure a long stage life.

In the early 20th century, Hertz and his cousin Paweł edited Goniec Łódzki. From 1905, with Paweł, he supported the Uczelnia Society, opening Łódź's first state Polish secondary school in 1906 (now Mikołaj Kopernik First High School). He joined Mieczysław Kaufman's Society for Education Promotion on 1906, expanding free libraries, later joining its board. In 1913, he entered the Polish Theatrical Society, later becoming vice-president.

=== World War I period ===
After World War I began, Hertz aided the Łódź Citizens' Committee, formed on 3 August 1914 under Alfred Biedermann, restructured on 10 August 1914 as the Main Citizens' Committee, based at 96 Piotrkowska Street in the Siemens factory. Its goal, per a press appeal, was to maintain "calm and safety" with authorities.

He joined the militia established on 10 August 1914 as the Central Citizens' Militia Committee. On 13 August 1914, representing the militia, he delivered a funeral oration at the new Jewish cemetery for Tanchy Weingarten, a militiaman fatally wounded on 11 August 1914 during an arrest on Aleksandrowska Street (now Limanowski Street), dying at the Poznań Hospital (now Sterling University Hospital). Later, in October 1914, he led the militia's Pass Department.

Hertz was active in the Citizens' Aid Committee for the Poor, chaired by pastor Rudolf Gundlach, serving on its Fifth District board with priests Wacław Wyrzykowski and Otton Fryderyk Krenz. The district spanned Piotrkowska, Andrzeja (now Struga), Łąkowa, Karolewska, and St. Anna (now Mickiewicz) streets, including Łódź Kaliska railway station, with offices at 97 Piotrkowska Street and a warehouse at 157 Piotrkowska Street (now demolished).

After German forces occupied Łódź on 6 December 1914, Hertz inspected the Battle of Łódź sites for the authorities, noting:

Trips to the battlefields began. People collected shrapnel fragments, cartridge cases, broken bayonets, and soldiers' letters – German and Russian. I held a letter from deep Russia, hard to read due to its clumsy handwriting. It reported all were well, wishing the recipient health, noting a neighbor's cow had calved, and Matriona had married... This life's prose was jarring against the tragedy of a soldier dying far from home. [...] They slaughtered each other on this land, stripped of freedom by Catherine the Great and Frederick the Great.

On 7 July 1915, Hertz joined the 36-member City Council, appointed by German occupiers, equally split among Poles, Germans, and Jews. Refusal risked penalties. In August 1916, he joined Emil Hirszberg's Municipal Appraisal Commission at 90 Piotrkowska Street, under the War Losses Registration Department of Warsaw's Main Welfare Council, advocating for health damage claims from forced labor, data later used in his post-war writings.

Hertz was among 73 Łódź signatories of the Łódź Communiqué on 22 November 1916, an open letter urging the immediate creation of a Provisional Council of State. During elections from 15 January to 21 January 1917 under the Warsaw Governorate's ordinance, he won a Łódź City Council seat from the Polish Electoral Committee's intelligentsia list. The council began on 23 May 1917 at 17 Średnia Street (now 21 Pomorska Street), ending in February 1919. As an assimilationist, he chaired the Polish Councillors' Circle, opposing Jewish groups like the Bund seeking cultural autonomy and Yiddish rights.

With Eugeniusz Krasuski and Aleksy Rżewski, he proposed a Municipal Statistical Office, approved on 19 September 1917. He joined its organizing commission, and it began on 1 January 1918, with Hertz overseeing it.

=== Interwar period ===
Throughout the interwar years, Hertz ran his trading office, representing firms like Belgium's Solvay SA (caustic soda), jute factories, Stradom SA, Ginsberg and Kohn's paper mill, and Sosnowiec Pipe and Iron Works. His son worked there too. He served on the boards of Strem Chemical Works and the Łódź Mutual Credit Society, founded in 1897 by Jewish entrepreneurs.

On 1 September 1920, he became a lay judge at Łódź District Court. In August 1921, he trained census commissioners for Poland's first census on 30 September 1921. In 1929, as a trade advisor, he spoke at the Lviv Chambers of Commerce Congress on economic cycles. He was deputy delegate to the State Railway Council and served on a cotton yarn subcommittee. On 28 May 1931, he was unanimously elected vice-president of the Łódź Chamber of Commerce's trade section until October 1939. On 23 October 1934, he chaired a Polish-English textile conference. He was vice-president of the Łódź Merchants' Association from 6 June 1935, and edited its journal Głos Kupiectwa after Józef Sachs' death in mid-1931.

In the 1930s, he joined the Wiek Cement Industry Company's board in Ogrodzieniec. In 1937, the nationalist Falanga listed him in an antisemitic article about Wiek.

A noted social and cultural activist, Hertz loved statistics. Post-war, he proposed Poland's first statisticians' congress (planned for January 1920, held in May in Warsaw). In 1919, he published a demographic study of Łódź, later called its first statistical monograph by ex-mayor Aleksy Rżewski. In June 1920, he deputized for Stefan Kopciński in the Central Statistical Office. In 1922, he co-authored Łódź's first statistical yearbook. In 1937, Rżewski credited him with initiating alcoholism studies in Łódź. He was a Polish Statistical Society member between 1938 and 1939.

Hertz wrote on Łódź's World War I history. In 1920, he published Łódzki Bataljon Robotniczy, using forced laborers' testimonies. In 1933, the Łódź Historical Society released Łódź w czasie Wielkiej Wojny, a key source on the period.

He joined the Polish Historical Society in 1927, co-founded the Friends of Łódź Society between 1936 and 1937, and helped establish the Łódź Scientific Society in March 1937. He pushed for a Łódź Higher Commercial School.

For his social and professional work, he received the Knight's Cross of the Order of Polonia Restituta in November 1938.

=== World War II period ===
On 5 November 1939, Hertz was named to the first Council of Elders of Łódź's Jewish Community by Chaim Rumkowski under German orders. On 11 November 1939, he and all members were arrested during the Intelligenzaktion Litzmannstadt, detained at the Radogoszcz transit camp (55 Krakowska Street, now 17 Liściasta Street).

Recognized for his anti-German pre-war writings, he faced abuse – forced to crawl and dig with his hands, injuring himself, targeted by Łódź Volksdeutsche. After weeks, he was deported to the General Government, possibly Kraków, then reached Warsaw, joining his daughter Aniela or sister Amelia. In the Warsaw Ghetto, he was shot on 18 January 1943 at the Umschlagplatz. Eugeniusz Grasberg noted he worked on a ghetto economic history until his death, using Judenrat documents.

== Personal life ==
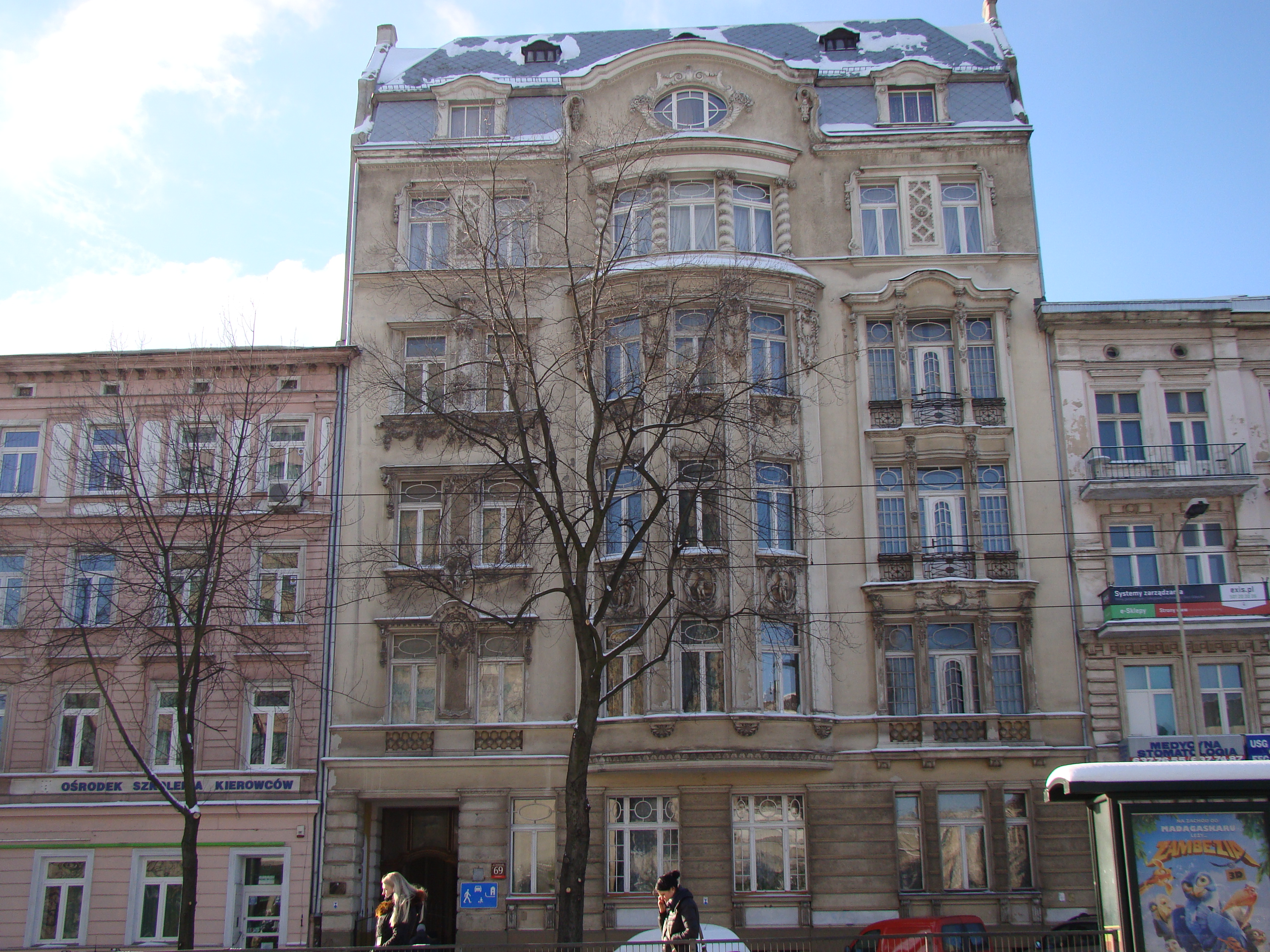
Tenement at 69 Kościuszki Avenue, Łódź – residence of Mieczysław and Zygmunt Hertz (January 2013)

Hertz had four siblings:

- Dorota (born 1871), Zygmunt Toeplitz's first wife, died in an Alpine accident in 1907.
- Cecylia Ernestyna (born 1872, later Oderfeldowa), taught secretly during partitions, co-founded Paath, co-authored Arytmetyka na wesoło, and patented a geometric tool (1937); died in the ghetto in November 1941.
- Amelia (born 1879), an Egyptologist and Assyriologist, wrote dramas and co-authored Od Wisły do Nilu; arrested in 1941, died at Pawiak in 1942.

In 1901, he married Maria Maybaum. They had two children: Zygmunt and Aniela (later Olszewska). The marriage ended in 1918 or 1920. Interwar, he lived with Zygmunt at 69 Kościuszki Avenue, also his office. His daughter-in-law Zofia Hertz became Łódź's first female notary on 13 May 1933. Post-war, she and Zygmunt co-founded the Literary Institute with Jerzy Giedroyc.

== Legacy ==
- In spring 2016, Jacek Orłowski founded the Mieczysław Hertz Theatrical Institute (approved by Hertz's Łódź-based great-granddaughter), aiming to revive theater-related sites' awareness. It launched on 20 October 2016 at the Grand Hotel with a semi-improvised performance of Ananke.
- On 1 January 2018, Łódź governor Zbigniew Rau renamed a street (formerly Lucjan Szenwald) after Hertz in the Chojny district.

== Bibliography ==
- Hertz, Mieczysław (1933). Łódź w czasie Wielkiej Wojny [Łódź During the Great War] (in Polish). Łódź: Polish Historical Society. Archived from the original on 2016-03-05.
- Hertz, Mieczysław (2014). "Łódź podczas Wielkiej Wojny" [Łódź During the Great War]. In Danowska, Małgorzata (ed.). Bezbronne miasto. Łódź 1914–1918 [Defenseless City. Łódź 1914–1918] (in Polish). Łódź: Jacek Kusiński. Narodowe Centrum Kultury. ISBN 978-83-927666-1-2.
- Puś, Wiesław (1998). Żydzi w Łodzi w latach zaborów 1793–1914 [Jews in Łódź During the Partitions 1793–1914] (PDF) (in Polish). Łódź: Wydawnictwo Uniwersytetu Łódzkiego. ISBN 83-7171-165-4.
- Spodenkiewicz, Paweł (2014). "Obywatele" [Citizens]. In Danowska, Małgorzata (ed.). Bezbronne miasto. Łódź 1914–1918 [Defenseless City. Łódź 1914–1918] (in Polish). Łódź: Jacek Kusiński. Narodowe Centrum Kultury. ISBN 978-83-927666-1-2.
- Stawiszyńska, Aneta (2016). Łódź w latach I wojny światowej [Łódź During World War I] (in Polish). Oświęcim: Napoleon V. ISBN 978-83-65495-27-3.
