= Sebastian Grabowiecki =

Polish Catholic priest and poet

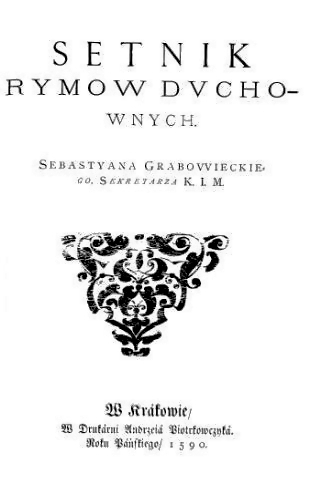
Grabowiecki

Sebastian Grabowiecki (c. 1543 – 1607) was a Polish Catholic priest and poet. He was the author of Setnik rymów duchownych and Setnik rymów duchownych wtóry (Spiritual Rhymes parts 1 and 2). His work, focused entirely on religious themes (like George Herbert's), was strongly influenced by Italian poetry, especially by Rime Spirituali by Gabriele Fiamma. One of the founding fathers of Polish lyric poetry, Grabowiecki was one of the first poets to write sonnets in Polish. Thus he holds a position comparable to Thomas Wyatt, Henry Howard, Earl of Surrey and Portuguese poet Francisco de Sá de Miranda, who introduced the sonnet into their native literatures. He also wrote the first Polish poem in ottava rima, and was an early adopter of the Sapphic stanza in Polish poetry. His best-known poem is a sonnet (based on one of Fiamma's) similar to Philip Sidney's Sonnet 89 from Astrophel and Stella ("Now that of absence the most irksome night"), with the use of epistrophe (repetition of end-words) instead of rhyme.

Z twej śmierci, Jezu, dochodziem żywota;
Śmierć podejmując dla nas, władzą śmierci
Bierzesz, a z twej k nam miłości tej śmierci
Moc dawasz, co nas wpuszcza do żywota.

Translation:

With thy death, Jesus, is accomplished life;
Death undergoing for us, the power of death
You take, and by thy loving hand through death
Power bestow, which brings us unto life.
