= Wanda Szczawińska =

Polish biologist, pediatrician, lecturer

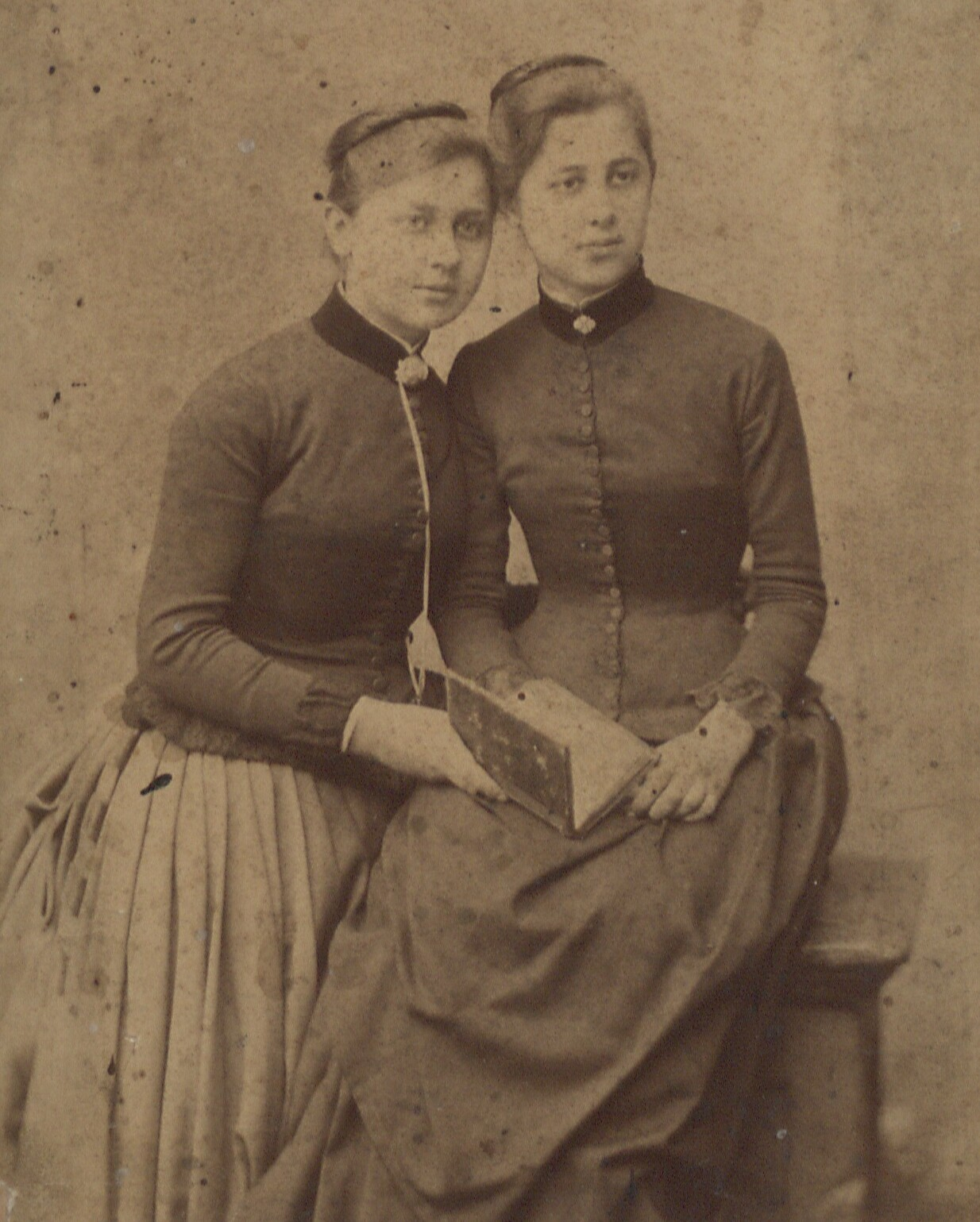
- Wanda and Jadwiga Szczawińska
- Born: 13 June 1866; Warsaw
- Died: 21 April 1955 (aged 88); Krakow

Wanda Marie Szczawińska (June 13, 1866 – April 21, 1955) was a Polish biologist, pediatrician, lecturer, social activist, journalist, and member of the Order of Polonia Restituta.

== Biography ==
Szczawińska was born in Warsaw, Congress Poland, Russian Empire on 13 June 1866 to Wojciech Szczawiński and Bronisława née Gumbrychty. She had two siblings, Gustaw Szczawiński and Jadwiga Szczawińska-Dawidowa. She would marry Henryk Melcer-Szczawiński.

From 1888 to 1891 she studied at the University of Geneva in the college of life sciences. As a student of Carl Vogt she completed her dissertation in 1891 and obtained a doctorate in natural sciences. After her graduation, she became a lecturer at the underground Flying University in Warsaw. In 1894 she moved to Paris to pursue medical studies, working at the Sorbonne in the biological laboratory of Yves Delage. In 1902, she obtained her second doctorate, this time in medicine. She then worked at the Pasteur Institute before becoming a doctor at the Fondation Zola à Médan, a facility for convalescent infants, in 1907.

Szczawińska again returned to Warsaw in 1910, where she organized a medical clinic for infants. In 1914, she organized a program to promote children's hygiene. Hygiene became one of her main focuses, and she gave lectures on the subject at the Warsaw Scientific Society from 1911 to 1918.

In addition to lecturing, during World War I Szczawińska worked as a doctor at the St. Stanisław Kostka and the Holy Spirit Hospital in Warsaw as well as in the Sanitary Section of the Citizens' Committee of Warsaw. In 1924, she became a member of the International Association of Doctors. In 1925 she gave a presentation on modern infant nutrition for the Congress of Polish Doctors and Naturalists at the Warsaw University of Technology for which she earned first prize and a gold medal. Thanks to her efforts in raising awareness about infant nutrition and hygiene, a health pavilion for infants was established in the Saski Garden in 1926. In the following years she regularly lectured at the State Farm Teachers' Seminary and the University of Economics in Chyliczki. Additionally, she collaborated with the French Bulletin de l'Institut Pasteur and wrote around eighty studies and scientific articles in the fields of life science, pediatrics, and hygiene.

In 1954, Szczawińska was awarded the Order of Polonia Restituta for her work. Shortly after, in 1955, she died and was buried in the Rakowicki Cemetery in Krakow.
