= Jan Władysław Dawid =

Polish psychologist

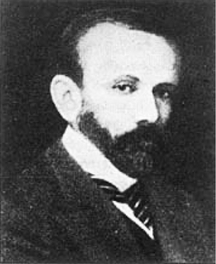
- Born: 26 June 1859; Lublin
- Died: 9 July 1914 (aged 55)
- Education: Warsaw University
- Occupations: Educator, Lecturer, Psychologist, Writer, Editor
- Spouse: Jadwiga Szczawińska (1893-1910)

Jan Władysław Dawid (26 June 1859 in Lublin – 9 July 1914) was a teacher, psychologist, pioneer of educational psychology and experimental pedagogy in Poland. He was a lecturer at the Flying University (now known as the Society for Educational Courses, also known as The Society for Science Courses) in Warsaw. He since held other numerous roles including editor of a number of Polish journals such as the Educational Review (Przegląd Pedagogiczny) (1889–1897), Voice (Głos) (1900–1905) and Social Review (Przegląd Społeczny) (1906–1907).

== Life ==
Dawid studied law at Warsaw University from 1872 and after graduating, went on to Leipzig and Halle, Saxony-Anhalt from 1882 to 1884 to study natural sciences. There he was heavily influenced by W. Wundt and H. Ebbinghaus. His largest merits were on the basis of empirical psychology to spread the idea of conducting experimental research on children, on their perceptions and concepts of the world, their thinking and intelligence, while the idea of developing a child's mind, his will and action skills. These ideas disseminated by both the conduct of systematic research, involvement in the numerous group of collaborators, by writing books on these studies, developing their own research and by translating books from many languages. David's interest in issues related initially to education, which had developed a base in the work of science (1892). His many influences in education while in Germany included figures such as Wilhelm Dilthey, A. Lichtwark, W.T. Preyer and W. Rein.

Upon returning to Warsaw, Dawid made his first publication in 1887: Programme of Psycho-Educational Observations of Children from Birth to the Age of 20. This was also the period he began translating German, Russian, French and English texts into Polish and began one of his major work Object Lessons (published 1891). In 1889 he married Jadwiga Szczawińska, teacher and founder of the Flying University. Unfortunately, due to vast political activity in Poland at the time and difficulties in financing (Dawid's post as editor of Głos ending in 1905) eventually accumulated to the taking of Jadwiga's life in 1910 and subsequent worsening of Dawid's health.

Dawid later fled to Kraków where he enjoyed autonomy from the Tsarist police. In his O duszy nauczycielstwa (The Souls of Teachers) (1912) Dawid determines the ideal characteristics of a teacher, his "soul." As the most important among them David feels the love of human souls, and next to it mentions the need for excellence, a sense of responsibility and obligation, the accuracy of internal and moral courage. In his greatest work of psychological intelligence, the will and ability to work (1911) shows the relationship between intelligence, will and ability to work, which could be described as the glorification of work. Dawid believed that the able, and want to be able to - to three sources, which supply human life. "Know how" that is, to have intelligence, "want to" - will, "power" - the ability to work. David returned to Warsaw in 1913, continuing his teaching activities and planning many experiments before dying in 1914.

He is listed as one of the 100 most famous educators by the International Bureau of Education (IBE).

== Works ==
- Nauka o rzeczach (The Science of Things, 1892)
- Inteligencja, wola i zdolność do pracy (Intelligence, Will and the Ability to Work, Warsaw, 1911)
- O duszy nauczycielstwa (On the Soul of Teachership, Lublin, 1912)
- O intuicji w mistyce, filozofii i sztuce (On Intuition in Mysticism, Philosophy and Art, Kraków, 1913)
- O rzeczywistości duchowej (On Spiritual Reality, Warsaw, 1935)

== See also ==
- List of Poles
