= Maria Ilnicka =

Polish poet and novelist

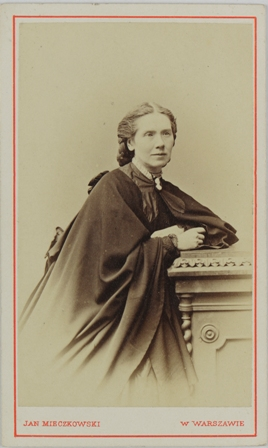
Maria Ilnicka.

Maria Ilnicka, née Majkowska (1825–1897) was a Polish poet, novelist, translator and journalist. She was the founder and editor of the magazine Bluszca (Ivy), which documented the Polish women's movement, from 1865 to 1896.

She took part in the January Uprising against Russia, serving as an archivist of Polish National Government. After the collapse of the uprising she was briefly imprisoned.

In the period between 1870 and 1890 she was active in the literary salons of Warsaw. She was author of idyllic comedy and wrote poetry as well as a novel. She also translated the work of Walter Scott and Johann Wolfgang von Goethe.

== Personal life ==
Her father was a colonel in the Polish military. Her husband was exiled to Siberia following the 1863 uprising.

== Works ==
- Maids Konopianki (Panny Konopianki)
- Name-day of good mother (Imieniny dobrej mamy)
- Illustrated jewel-box of Poland – the rhyming history of Poland with music by Stanisław Moniuszko (Ilustrowany skarbczyk Polski - rymowana historia Polski z muzyką Stanisława Moniuszki)

== See also ==
- Positivism in Poland
