= Anna Szelągowska =

Polish feminist, union organizer (1879-1962)

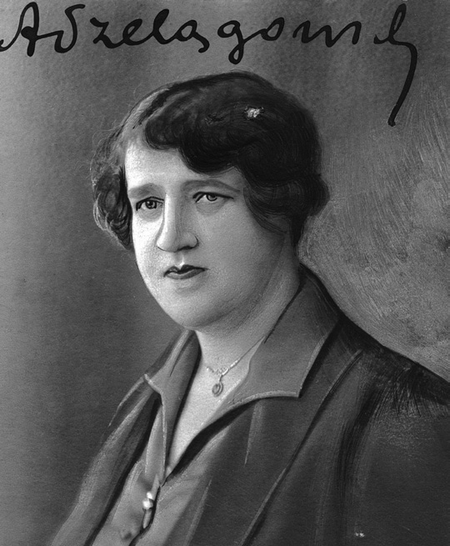
- Born: 20 July 1880; Warsaw, Vistula Land (now Poland)
- Died: May 1962 (aged 81); Geneva, Switzerland
- Education: Flying University (Polish: Uniwersytet Latający
- Occupations: Feminist, union organizer, and accountant
- Spouse: Aleksander Hertz
- Awards: Golden Cross of Merit

Anna Szelągowska, née Paradowska (20 July 1880 – May 1962), was a Polish feminist, union organizer and accountant.

== Life ==
Anna Szelągowska was born on 20 July 1880 in Warsaw, capital of the Vistula Land (now Poland). She enrolled in the first private high school to accept women, the Commercial High School, and graduated in 1898. Forced to get a job after her father's death, she worked as an office clerk while studying at the Flying University (Polish: Uniwersytet Latający).

Very little is known of her private life, but she married twice, her first husband being the bank clerk, Aleksander Hertz, later a film producer and director. Szelągowska spent World War I in Warsaw and worked for the Bank of the United Polish Territories from 1920 to 1926. She received the Golden Cross of Merit on 10 November 1931. In 1934, Szelągowska was appointed to the Auditing Commission of Warsaw's municipal government and then it appointed her to the Auditing Commission of the Municipal Savings Bank in 1936. She was elected to the Senate of Poland in 1938.

After World War II, Szelągowska moved to Wrocław and worked as a bookkeeper until 1950. In 1955, she was invited to Geneva, Switzerland, by the International Federation of Business and Professional Women. She lived there from 1959 to her death in May 1962.

== Activities ==
Szelągowska became secretary of the Polish Women's Rights Association (Polish: Polskie Stowarzyszenie Równouprawnienia Kobiet) during the first decade of the 20th century and also worked for the Polish Socialist Party (Polish: Polska Partia Socjalistyczna) although she never formally joined. In 1905, she and her husband founded the Labor Union for Employees of Private Banking Institutions of the Kingdom of Poland (Polish: Związek Zawodowy Pracowników Prywatnych Instytucji Bankowych Królestwa Polskiego), the first such union in Poland.
