= Flying University =

Former underground educational enterprise in Warsaw, Poland

The Flying University (Polish: Uniwersytet Latający, less often translated as "Floating University") was an underground educational enterprise that operated from 1885 to 1905 in Warsaw, the historic Polish capital, then under the control of the Russian Empire. Between 1977 and 1981 renewed Flying Universities were operated by dissident Poles in the communist-controlled People's Republic of Poland.

The Flying University and similar institutions aimed to provide Polish youth with opportunities for education within the framework of traditional Polish scholarship at times when that tradition collided with the ideology and practice of the governing authorities. In the 19th century, such underground institutions were important in the national effort to resist Germanization under Prussian and Russification under Russian occupation. In the People's Republic of Poland, the Flying University provided educational opportunities outside government censorship and control of education.

== History ==
=== Partitions ===
After the Polish–Lithuanian Commonwealth was partitioned in the late-18th century, its lands were divided among its neighbors: Imperial Russia, Prussia and Austria's Habsburg monarchy (which seven decades later became part of Austro-Hungary). Warsaw, the historic Polish capital, fell under Russian control. In the Russian and Prussian partitions the situation of Poles progressively worsened. Particularly in the Russian sector, the initially moderate ethnic policies were revised in the aftermath of the Polish revolts aimed at overthrowing Russian control, the November Uprising (1830–1831) and the January Uprising (1863–1864). Following the defeats of the uprising the autonomy of the Congress Poland was initially limited (1831) and finally abolished (1865).

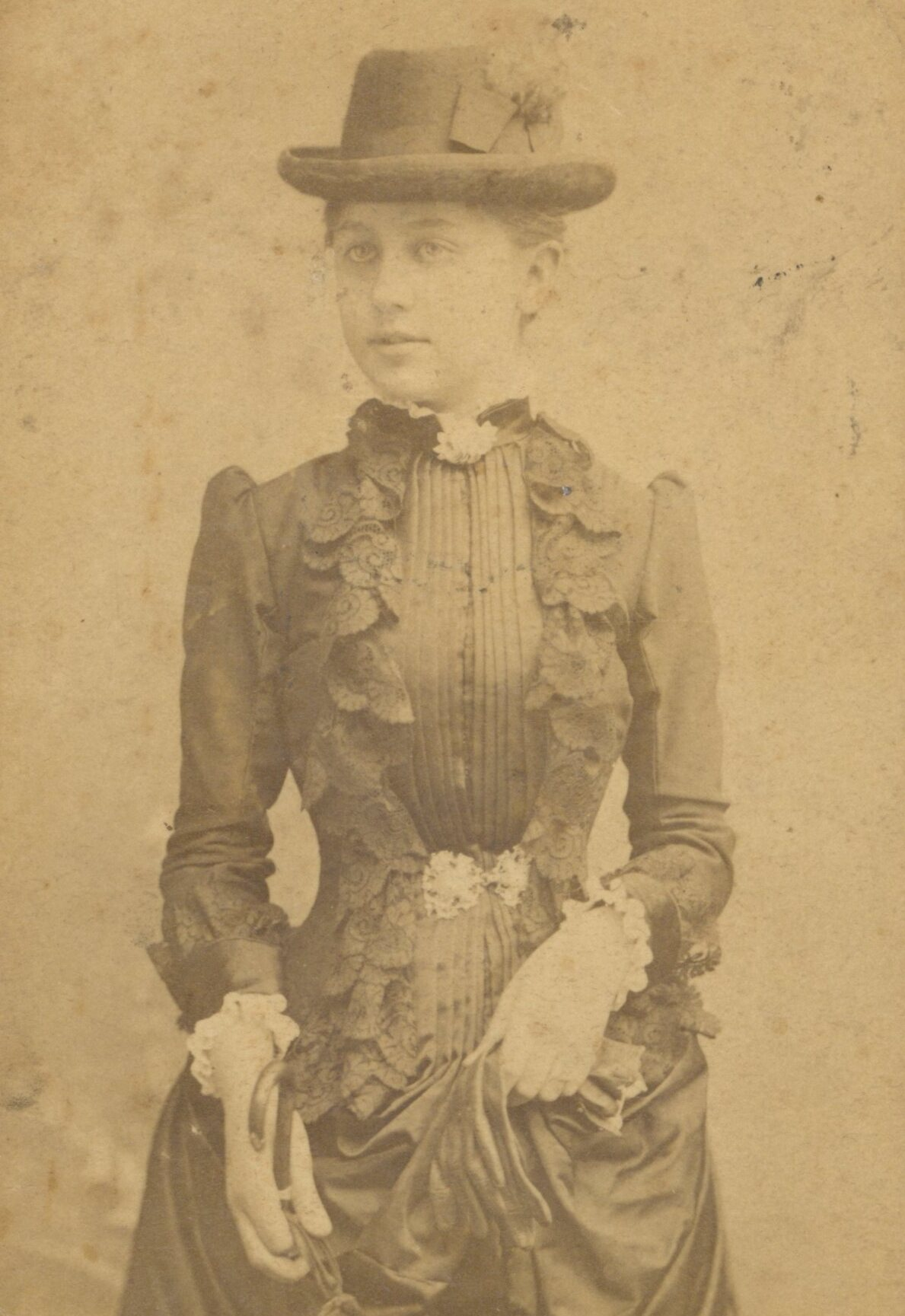
Jadwiga Szczawińska

Among the increasing policies of Germanization and Russification, it became increasingly difficult for Poles to obtain a Polish higher education. Also, the higher education opportunities for women that existed in the Russian Empire were severely limited, and teaching or research into some fields, like Polish language, Catholicism or Polish history, ranged from difficult to illegal.

As a response to such policies, and inspired by the Polish positivism movement, secret courses began in 1882 in private houses in Warsaw. At first it was a series of conspiratorial education courses for women, and among the first teachers were Józef Siemaszko, Stanisław Norblin, Piotr Chmielowski and Władysław Smoleński. In 1885 transformed due to the efforts of one of the students, Jadwiga Szczawińska (also known as Zofia Szczawińska), the various pro-education groups were united into a single, informal, and illegal, secret university open for both sexes known as the Flying University (the courses, spread throughout the city, often changed locations to prevent the Russian authorities from learning the location and arresting the teachers and students). The fees (2–4 rubles per month) were used as honoraria for the teachers and to create a secret library. The curriculum of the Flying University extended over 5–6 years with 8–11 hours per week and was divided into four main subjects: social sciences, pedagogy, philology and history, and natural sciences.

Among the teachers of the university were the best contemporary Polish academics, including many prominent liberals and socialists such as and Tadeusz Korzon (history), Bronisław Chlebowski, Ignacy Chrzanowski, socialist Zofia Daszyńska-Golińska and Piotr Chmielowski (literature), Jan Władysław David and Adam Mahrburg (philosophy), prominent Marxist anthropologist, economist and sociologist Ludwik Krzywicki and Józef Nussbaum-Hilarowicz (biology).

During the twenty years of the existence of the university, its courses were attended by approximately 5,000 women and men. Among the most famous of its students was the future Nobel Prize winner, Maria Skłodowska-Curie, more commonly known as Madame Curie. Other well known students included Zofia Nałkowska and Janusz Korczak.

=== Legalization ===
Around 1905–1906 the Flying University was able to start legal activities, and was transformed into the Society of Science Courses (Towarzystwo Kursów Naukowych), as Poland's partitioners, anticipating the First World War, sought to convert the Poles to their cause. Around 1918–1919, after Poland regained independence (as the Second Polish Republic), the Association was transformed into the private university, Free Polish University (Wolna Wszechnica Polska). In 1927 it founded a branch in Łódź.

=== World War II ===
During the Second World War, Poland was occupied by Nazi Germany which forbade Poles to attend university-level courses. University faculty members utilized their experience and took part in secret teaching during World War II.

=== People's Republic ===
After the Second World War, the Wolna Wszechnica Polska was not immediately recreated in Warsaw, although its branch in Łódź served as the foundation for the University of Łódź.

During the time of communist domination in the People's Republic of Poland, as the curriculum became a tool of politics, and much of Polish history (like the Polish-Soviet War, Katyn Massacre or Praga Massacre) was censored in an attempt to 'erase' the history of Polish-Russian conflicts, the tradition of the Flying University was revived once again, first by the Society of Free Polish University (Towarzystwo Wolnej Wszechnicy Polskiej) active in Warsaw from 1957, later from 1977 by the new Flying University and Society of Science Courses, supported by Polish dissidents including Stefan Amsterdamski, Jerzy Jedlicki, Andrzej Celiński, Bohdan Cywiński, Aldona Jawłowska, Jan Kielanowski, Andrzej Kijowski, Jacek Kuroń, Tadeusz Mazowiecki, Adam Michnik, and Wojciech Ostrowski.

Many participants of this second flying university were abused by milicja, with common incidents like a prominent dissident, Jacek Kuroń, being thrown down the stairs from his apartment, which was ransacked by milicja-supported thugs; despite this, the Flying University was active until the imposition of martial law in Poland in 1981, which, although designed to destroy the Solidarity movement, stifled the flying university's activities too.

== Notable people ==
=== Educators ===
- Piotr Chmielowsk, historian and philosopher
- Ignacy Chrzanowski, historian
- Jan Władysław David, psychologist
- Zofia Daszyńska-Golińska, politician and suffragist
- Tadeusz Korzon, historian
- Ludwik Krzywicki anthropologist, economist, and sociologist
- Jan Łukasiewicz, logician and philosopher
- Adam Mahrburg, philosopher
- Marian Massonius, philosopher
- Władysław Smoleński, historian and author
- Jan Walc, critic, literary historian, and journalist

=== Students ===
- Maria Bohuszewiczówna, Polish revolutionary
- Maria Czaplicka, cultural anthropologist
- Bronisława Dłuska (née Skłodowska), physician, co-founder and first director of Warsaw's Maria Skłodowska-Curie Institute of Oncology.
- Amelia Hertzówna, writer and cultural historian
- Jindřich Kabát, psychologist and politician
- Janusz Korczak, educator and children's author
- Tadeusz Łopalewski, writer and translator
- Zofia Nałkowska, writer and dramatist
- Aleksandra Piłsudska, socialist and independence activist
- Helena Skłodowska-Szalay, educator, inspector of Warsaw schools, educational activist
- Maria Skłodowska-Curie, Nobel Prize-winning physicist and chemist
- Franciszek Strynkiewicz, sculptor
- Jadwiga Szczawińska, educator, writer, and feminist
- Anna Szelągowska, feminist and union organizer
- Iza Zielińska, anarchist and feminist activist

== See also ==
- Marie Curie
- Polish University in Exile
- Education in Poland during World War II
- Polish resistance movement in World War II
