= Jan Walc =

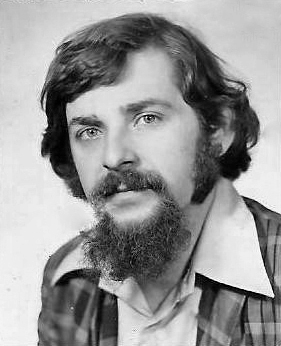
Jan Walc identity card 1979

Jan Walc (22 September 1948, Warsaw - 10 February 1993, Warsaw) was a Polish critic, literary historian, and journalist. He was the author of Feuilletons, reviews, reportage, and political and literary essays. A member of the democratic anti-communist opposition, the Workers Defense Committee (KOR), he was one of the organizers of the Independent Publishing House (NOWa), an underground publishing company and also operated the printing press. His works were published in Polityka, Kultura, Literatura na Świecie, Głos, Krytyka, Biuletyn Informacyjny, Kultura Niezależna, Puls, Zapis, Życie Warszawy, and Wokanda. He also wrote books on the works of Tadeusz Konwicki and Adam Mickiewicz.

He was born in Warsaw to a family of doctors, the son of Maria Róża Nowotna-Walcowa and Jan Stanisław Walc.

== Early career ==
After graduation from VI Liceum Ogólnokształcące im. Tadeusza Reytana in 1966, he began studies in the Pedagogy Department of the University of Warsaw, and a year later transferred to the Polish Philology Department. At the same time Walc became involved with the student group Theater Sigma. He was an active participant in the March 1968 events at the University of Warsaw as a member of the Warsaw University Strike Committee, and was arrested in March of that year. He spent three months in detention and from then on Walc was under constant surveillance by the Security Service. Despite passing the entrance examination to a doctoral studies programme, he was not allowed to study for his PhD, and after a year of teaching at the Warsaw's Liceum im. Stefan Batory, he was dismissed.

== Literary career ==
Walc made his debut as a literary critic in the biweekly magazine Współczesność in 1971. He continued his literary and critical work and published in Kultura, Literatura, Literatura na świecie, and Politytka. In 1975-1976 he taught the history of literature at the Warsaw Theater Academy (Państwowa Wyższa Szkoła Teatralna) and also gave lectures on postwar Polish literature at the underground Society of Scientific Courses (Towarzystwo Kursów Naukowych) - also called the Flying University. In 1976 he collaborated with KOR (Workers Defense Committee), co-organizing help for Radom and Ursus protesters and was subsequently deprived of the right to publish officially.

At first, he wrote for the illegal circuit under various pen names (Jan Biuletyn, Jan Woreczko, Lew Laicki), and from 1978 onwards under his own name. He was the editor of Biuletyn Informacyjny (1976–81) and Głos (1977–79), Krytyka (1978–82), Puls, and he also collaborated on Zapis. In 1978 he also began operating the printing press at NOWa.

As a member of the Intervention Bureau of Workers Defense Committee (KOR), Walc worked on registering cases of human rights violations in Poland. In 1980 he became a member of the Helsinki Committee for Human Rights of KOR, and co-authoring The Madrid Report on the state of human rights in Poland.

In September 1981, Walc enrolled at the Institute of Literary Research of the Polish Science Academy (IBL PAN). He was arrested again during martial law (December 13, 1981). After release from prison in 1983, he collaborated with underground publishing companies, became an editor of NOWa and co-founded the NOWa Foundation (Fundacja NOWej).

1982-1991 Walc was a co-editor of Niezależność, Krytyka, Kultura Niezależna, and Przegląd Wydarzeń Agencyjnych.

In 1986, he visited the United States as a Harvard University fellow and worked on Adam Mickiewicz. In 1986–87, Walc was a visiting scholar at universities in Stockholm and Bonn giving a series of lectures on Polish literature. During this period, he was dismissed from IBL PAN, and returned to work there only in 1989, after the fall of communism. In the 1990s he continued working with Tygodnik Kulturalny, Wokanda, and Życie Warszawy. He also had his own TV program Czytane inaczej (Read Differently) on Polish television.

== Publications ==
- Jan Walc, "Unofficial publishing", Index on Censorship Volume 8, Issue 6, 1979; Special Issue: Poland ‐ Breaking The State Monopoly

Jan Walc, "Unofficial publishing", 1979

- "Wybierane” – zbiór artykułów drukowanych w drugim obiegu z lat 1973–1989, Warszawa 1989
- "Ja już wygrałem” – Jan Walc rozmawia z senatorem płockim Andrzejem Celińskim, Warszawa 1991
- "Architekt Arki” – studium o A. Mickiewiczu, Warszawa 1991
- "Wielka choroba” – zbiór esejów literackich, Warszawa 1992
- "Ja tu tylko sprzątam” – zbiór artykułów z lat 1989–1993, Warszawa 1995
- "Tadeusza Konwickiego przedstawianie świata” – praca doktorska obroniona w 1977, Warszawa 2010
- Official webpage Jan Walc

== Awards ==
- Nagroda Fundacji POLCUL (Polish Cultural Foundation ) Award in Journalism 1984
- Nagroda im. Andrzeja Kijowskiego – Warszawa, 1990.

== Orders ==
- Commander's Cross of the Order of Polonia Restituta (Krzyz Komandorski Orderu Odrodzenia Polski) 2006

== Sources ==
Media related to Jan Walc at Wikimedia Commons
