= Pavel Tigrid =

Czech writer, publisher, author and politician

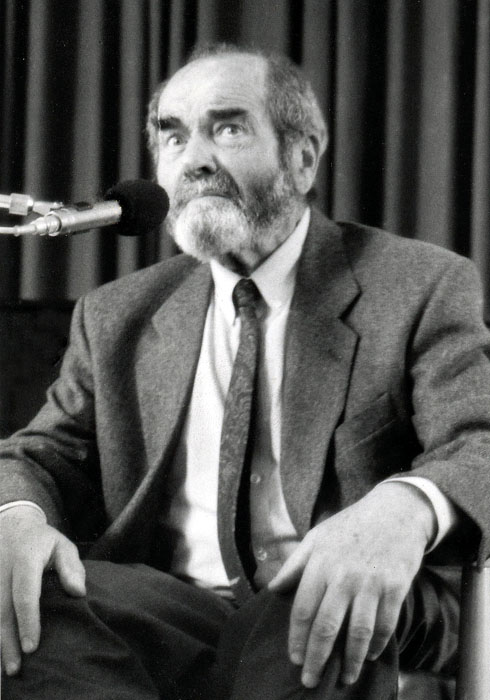

2nd Minister of Culture
- In office 19 January 1994 – 4 July 1996
- Prime Minister: Václav Klaus
- Preceded by: Jindřich Kabát
- Succeeded by: Jaromír Talíř

Personal details
- Born: Pavel Schönfeld; 27 October 1917 Prague, Austria-Hungary
- Died: 31 August 2003 (aged 85) Héricy, France
- Party: KDU-ČSL
- Occupation: Writer, journalist
- Awards: Order of Tomáš Garrigue Masaryk

Pavel Tigrid (27 October 1917 – 31 August 2003) was a Czech writer, publisher, author and politician. He is considered one of the most important personalities of Czech exile journalism.

== Biography ==
Pavel Schönfeld was born into an assimilated Jewish family in Prague on 27 October 1917. He left Czechoslovakia as a young man to evade the Nazis. In Great Britain, he adopted the pseudonym Tigrid (after river Tigris) when he worked as a broadcaster of anti-fascist propaganda in BBC, and kept it for the rest of his life. Returning after the end of World War II, he continued his publishing career, soon clashing with the ascendant communist ideology. Fleeing arrest, he emigrated to West Germany, later moved to United States and finally settled in France. During the Cold War, Tigrid was a prominent representative of Czech anti-communist exile, authored several books and published numerous publications, for example the magazine Svědectví ("Testimony"), read both in exile circles and by dissidents in Czechoslovakia from 1956 to 1992. He returned to Prague for the second time after the Velvet Revolution, was active in public life and served as the minister of culture (1994–96), but after an unsuccessful campaign for election to the Czech Senate, he retired to France where he died in 2003.

== Literary works ==
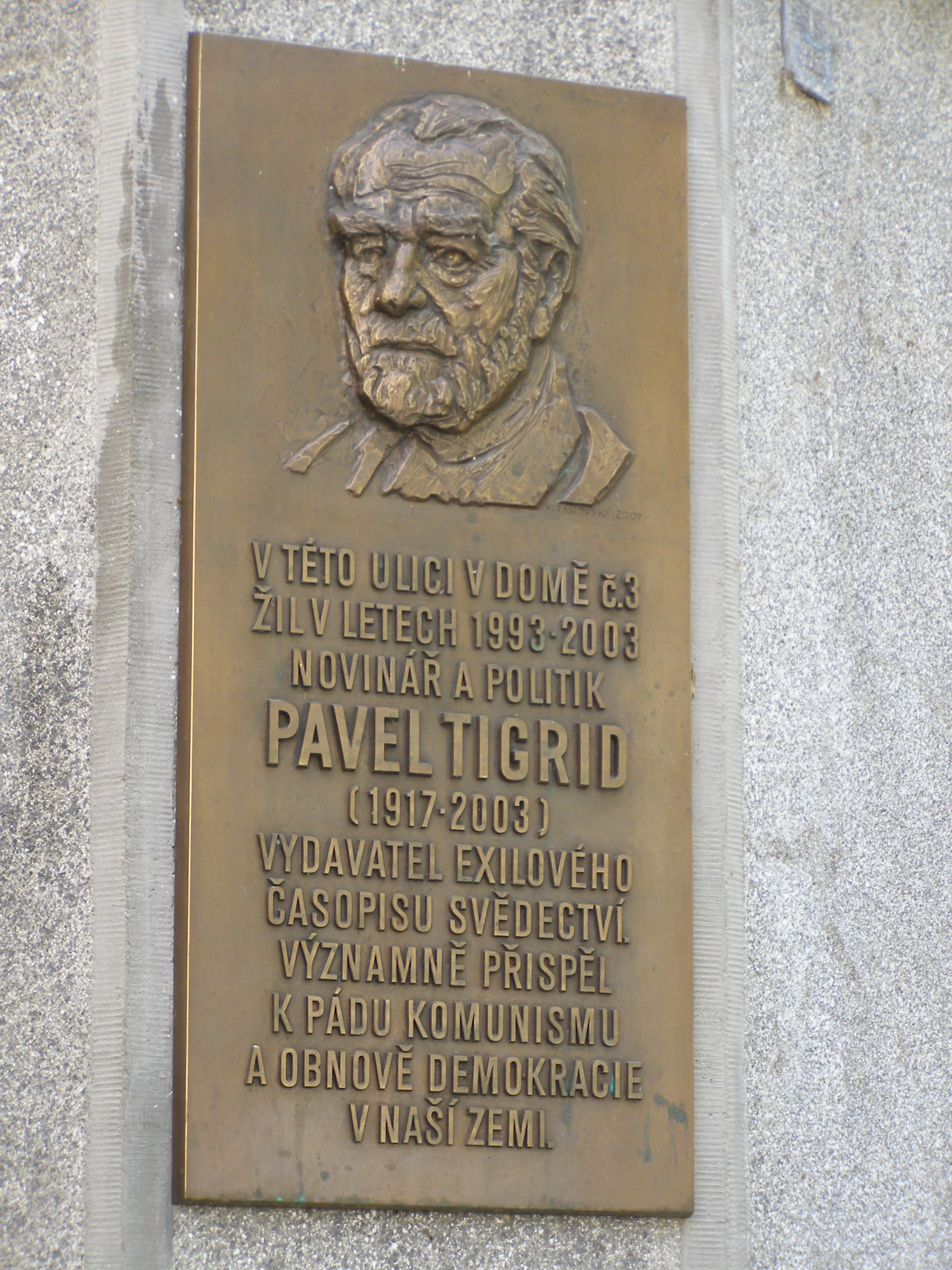
Plaque for P. Tigrid in Prague

- Why Dubcek Fell, London: MacDonald, 1971.
- Kapesní průvodce inteligentní ženy po vlastním osudu, Toronto: Sixty-Eight Publishers, 1988.
- Dnešek je váš, zítřek je náš : dělnické revolty v komunistických zemích, Praha: Vokno, 1990.
- Politická emigrace v atomovém věku, Praha: Prostor, 1990.
- Glosy o české politice 1996-1999, Praha: Radioservis, 1999.
- Marx na Hradčanech, Brno: Barrister & Principal, 2001.

Government offices
Preceded by Jindřich Kabát	Minister of Culture of the Czech Republic; 1994–1996	Succeeded by Jaromír Talíř
