= Tadeusz Korzon =

Polish historian

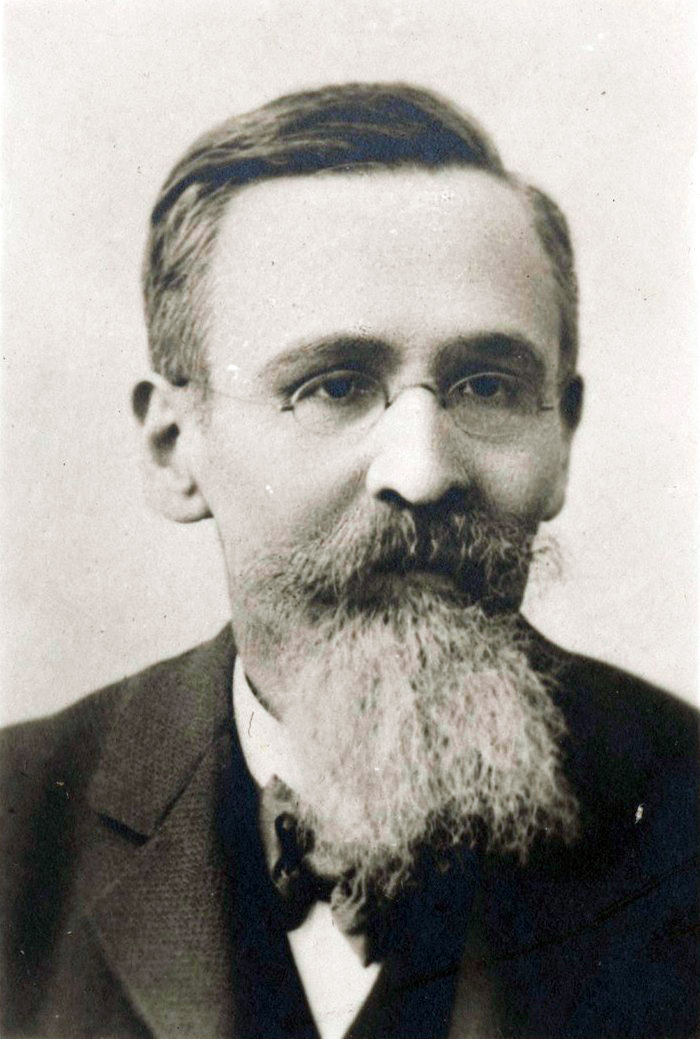
Tadeusz Korzon

Tadeusz Korzon (1839—1918) was a historian specializing in the history of Poland.

== Biography ==
Korzon was born to Polish parents in Lithuania, and as a youth he studied law at Moscow University.

He took part in the January Uprising (1863-1865) of Poles against the Russian occupation (partitions of Poland) by organising pro-Polish patriotic demonstrations. After the defeat of the Uprising he was sentenced to death, later changed to exile to Orenburg until 1867. Afterwards from 1869 he lived in Warsaw, where he became of the teachers in the Flying University. From 1897 he was the head librarian of the Biblioteka Zamojskich. From 1903 member of the Polska Akademia Umiejętności.

== Works ==
- Kurs historyi wieków średnich (Warsaw, 1871),
- Nowe dzieje starożytnéj Mezopotamii i Iranu (1872),
- Historycy pozytywisci" and "Poranek filozofii greckiej (Bibl. Warszawska),
- Ludzie przehistoriczny (Tygodn. Illustrow.),
- Historyja starożytną (Warsaw, 1876),
- Stan ekonowiczny Polski w latach 1782—1792 (Ateneum, 1877),
- O życiu umysłowlym Grecyi (Tygodn. Illustrow.),
- Historyk w obec swego narodu i w obec ludzkości (1878)

His earliest work was related to the French and English system of punishments and was published in 1861. His main work was published by the Krakow academy of sciences "Wewnętrne dzieje Polski za Stanislawa-Augusta, 1764—94" (1882 - 1886) (4 tomes) and gave many new statistical, administrative and economic details about the internal life of Poland in the 18th century. One of his last works was the "Dzieje wojen i wojskowości w Polsce" (3 tomes) published in 1912.
