= Tadeusz Łopalewski =

Polish poet, prose writer and dramatist

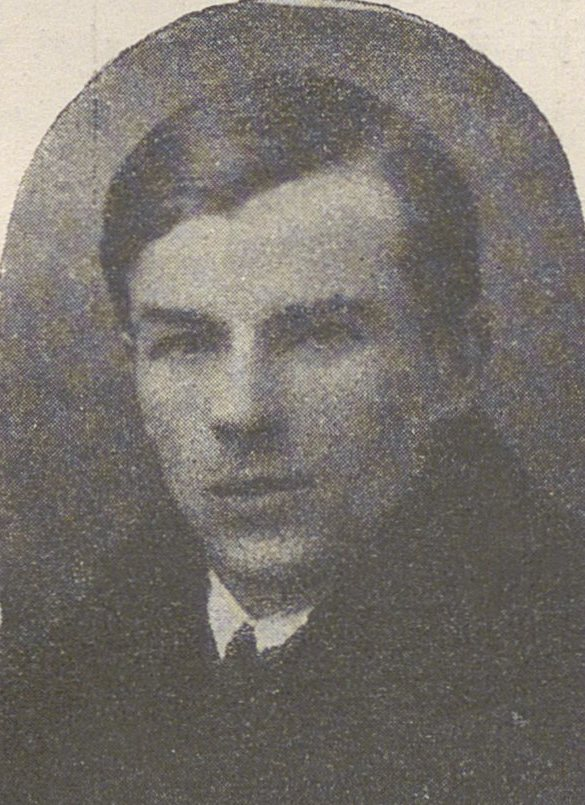
Tadeusz Łopalewski in 1926

Tadeusz Łopalewski (August 17, 1900 in Ostrowce, near Kutno – March 29, 1979) was a Polish poet, prose writer, dramatist and translator of Russian literature and producer of many radio programs.

Łopalewski finished his studies in the Humanities Department of the Flying University in Warsaw. In 1917 his first poems were published in a Polish newspaper in St. Petersburg. In 1921 he published his first volume of poetry, "Gwiazdy tańczące" (Dancing stars). From 1923 he lived in Wilno where he worked for the newspapers, in theater and in radio. Between 1935 and 1937 he was the editor of the quarterly "Środy Literackie" (Literary Wednesdays). Before World War II he was the director of the literary Town Theater in Wilno, and also the director of the Wilno radio station. Between 1945 and 1949 he worked for radio stations in Lodz and Warsaw.

In 1933 he received the "Filomat" Award for his translations of Russian bylinas into Polish.
