= Jindřich Kabát =

Czech psychologist and politician (1953–2020)

Minister of Culture
- In office 2 July 1992 – 17 January 1994
- Prime Minister: Václav Klaus
- Preceded by: Milan Uhde
- Succeeded by: Pavel Tigrid

Personal details
- Born: 24 April 1953 Prague, Czechoslovakia
- Died: 14 July 2020 (aged 67)
- Party: KDU-ČSL
- Spouse: Gabriela Kabátová
- Education: Charles University

Jindřich Kabát (24 April 1953 – 14 July 2020) was a Czech psychologist, professor and politician. He was the first Minister of Culture of the Czech Republic, holding the office from 1992 to 1994.

== Education ==
Having studied unofficially in the Polish Flying University, Kabát studied a master's in psychology research and methodology at Charles University in Prague, completing his PhDr there in 1978. He was a visiting professor at Christopher Newport University from 2004-2005, then professor and co-director of the European Centre until 2009, in Virginia, United States. He participated in the postgraduate program at Wheaton College, Illinois, United States, as well as numerous foreign study programs related to governance and culture.

Jindřich Kabát was a named expert of the Court of law for psychology and psychopathology.

== Pedagogical activities ==
From 1977 to 1983, Kabát worked in the psychiatric clinic at the medical faculty of Charles University in Prague, in the field of diagnostic and general psychology for students of medicine. He also carried out pedagogical and research work at the Research Institute of Culture from 1977. He was the chair of the Department of Psychology and Sociology Research from 1981, and the Department of Art from 1982.

Kabát taught psychology of art from 1983 at the Academy of Theater Arts, and practical education in dramatic arts from 1985 to 1989. He also taught psychology of art at the Philosophical Faculty of Charles University, and later at the College for Journalism in Prague, from 1996 to 1998. He taught psychology of personality at the Department of Ethics at the Theological Faculty of Charles University from 1998 to 2002.

From 2004 to 2009, he was the co-director of the European Program at Christopher Newport University, in Virginia, United States, teaching the psychology of Communism and Anglo-American thinking. From 2011 he taught psychology of totalitarianism, psychology and psychopathology and art at Anglo-American University in Prague.

== Political career ==
After the Velvet Revolution, Kabát became the First Deputy of the Ministry of Culture from 1990 to 1991, then held the same position at the Ministry of Interior from 1991 to 1992, responsible for the Bureau of Investigation.

He was a member of the Committee for Culture of the European Parliament in Strasbourg, and the authorized representative of the Czech Government for Refugee Issues.

From 1992 to 1994, Kabát served in the cabinet as the Minister of Culture, serving on a common Czech and Slovak Committee for dividing the cultural heritage of Czechoslovakia between the two new countries, during negotiations from 1992-1993. He was also vice-chairman of the Czech Committee of UNESCO.

In 1994 he served as Chairman of the Radio and Television Broadcast Council. He was subsequently Chairman of the Governmental Advisory Board for Ethnic Minorities.

In 2004, he was appointed as an adviser to the Minister of Foreign Affairs.

== Personal life ==
In 1977, Kabát married Gabriela Sladková, the Chair of the Czech Prison Fellowship. They had two daughters and three sons.

== Selected works ==
Jindřich Kabát was the author of the following works:

=== Books ===
- 1979 - Psychologie ve výzkumech kultury, nakl. UVK, Praha
- 1982 - (with D. Pokorná) Dramatické umění - preference mladých lidí, nakl. UVK, Praha
- 2011 - Psychologie komunismu, nakl. Práh, Praha
- 2013 - Groh, nakl. Čas, Praha
- 2013 - Útěk :I. Až na samé hranici
- 2014 - Útěk: II. Pád listu, společně, nakl. Triton, Praha
- 2016 - (with K.Janeček, M.Kabát) Karel Janeček v roce 2112, Albatros, edice XYZ, Praha
- 2016 - Dvoukolejná vášeň
- 2016 - Dvojí návrat
- 2016 - Trosečník
- 2016 - Nenažraná, souborně, Albatros, edice XYZ, Praha
- 2017 - Poloviční dvojčata, Triton
- 2017 - (with Vaclav Malý, M.Kabát) Václav Malý Rozhovory, Albatros Media, edice XYZ, Praha

=== Anthologies and published speeches ===
- Daniel, L., Holba, J., Kabát, J., Kabele, J., Krch, F.: NG Praha 1988: Research of the Aesthetic dimension of the Personality by Children
- J.Kabat in: Modern Czech Art, Wien 1992
- J.Kabat, introduction in: Modern Czech Visual Art, opening, London 1993
- J.Kabat, in: Czech Visual Art Exposition in Paris, Paris 1993
- J.Kabat in: M.Soldat (Ed.): Dialogs about transformation of Society, chapter: Dialog with Jindrich Kabat, Nadační fond proti korupci, Praha 2011
- J.Kabát: Corruption phenomena from the point of view of Psychology, in: kol.: Fenomen korupce, Martin Soldat (Ed.), Nadační fond proti korupci, Praha 2012
