= Głos (1886–1905) =

Polish language weekly review

Głos (The Voice; Polish pronunciation: [ˈɡwɔs]) was a Polish language social, literary and political weekly review published in Warsaw between 1886 and 1905. It was one of the leading journals of the Polish positivist movement. Many of the most renowned Polish writers published their novels in Głos, which also became a tribune of the naturalist literary movement of the late 19th century. During the Revolution of 1905 it was closed down by tsarist authorities.

The literary section published works by some of the most renowned Polish writers and poets of the epoch, including Adolf Dygasiński, Jan Kasprowicz, Bolesław Leśmian, Maria Konopnicka, Władysław Orkan, Eliza Orzeszkowa, Wacław Sieroszewski, Stanisław Przybyszewski and Leopold Staff. Głos also frequently published translated literary works of contemporary foreign writers. Among the notable journalists of the weekly was also Janusz Korczak who authored numerous editorials, reportages and feuilletons, as well as had one of his novels published there in 1904 and 1905.

== 1886–1894 ==
Officially dubbed the "scientific, literary, social and political weekly", it was first issued in October 1886. Initially clearly leftist and pro-positivist, by 1888 the journal had changed directions and started siding with the right side of the political scene. While published officially and accepted by the Imperial Russian censorship, it was secretly financed and headed by the underground National League organisation acting clandestinely in all three Partitions of Poland (and a predecessor of the rightist National-Democratic Party), led by Roman Dmowski. It was targeted mostly at intelligentsia, but thanks to novels and short stories published in every issue Głos had gained also much readership among lower strata of the society.

The journal retained a mildly positivist programme, calling for the creation of a "new society", based upon new principles, but seldom specifying what the principles should be. The newspaper's political editorials also touched upon the problems of assimilation of Jewry, education of the masses and emancipation of lower classes.

=== Antisemitism ===
In 1886 the co-founder of the magazine Jan Ludwik Popławski called for the assimilation of the Polish Jewry, but doubted the possibility of its realization, because of "fundamental religious and anthropological differences". According to the Polish historian Alina Cała this was the first ever reference to racism in the Polish press.

While antisemitic tendencies in Popławski's editorials became apparent from the magazine's inaugural year, another Głos editor Józef Potocki advocated friendship with Polish Jews and attempted to counter the influence of Rola magazine, which was openly antisemitic and more popular among people belonging to a lower stratum of the Polish society.

But from 1889 Głos was rapidly becoming openly antisemitic. The articles dedicated to "the Jewish question" became more frequent, their rhetoric was becoming more violent. According to historian Brian Porter: "The glosowcy ["people of the Głos"] were well aware that they were repositioning Polish anti-Semitism and giving it legitimacy for the radical intelligentsia". But still in contrast to Rola, Głos was avoiding emotional language and personal attacks. While Rola's antisemitism was of an economic origin, Głos presented ideological antisemitism. By 1891 Głos had created an outline of the anti-Jewish programme, which was soon adopted by National Democracy.

Głos practically ceased to exist in 1894, after most of its staff (including the acting editor in chief Jan Ludwik Popławski) had been arrested by tsarist authorities for taking part in an illegal commemoration of the 100th anniversary of the Kościuszko Uprising. Although most were set free the following year, they were not allowed to publish the newspaper any more.

== 1895–1905 ==
The journal was reformed under the leadership of Zygmunt Wasilewski, another of the National League's activists, until then a collaborator of Stefan Żeromski and one of the founders of the Polish National Library in Rapperswil. While still supportive of the National League's vision of future Polish statehood, it returned to a more pro-leftist stance. During the last five years of its existence, the journal was headed by a renowned psychologist and teacher Jan Władysław Dawid, who bought the title in 1901. Under his leadership Głos became somewhat more leftist, openly criticising the bourgeoisie, gentry and other privileged classes. During the Revolution in the Kingdom of Poland (part of the Revolution of 1905) it was closed, in December 1905, by the Russian authorities.
