= Franciszek Krupiński =

Polish philosopher

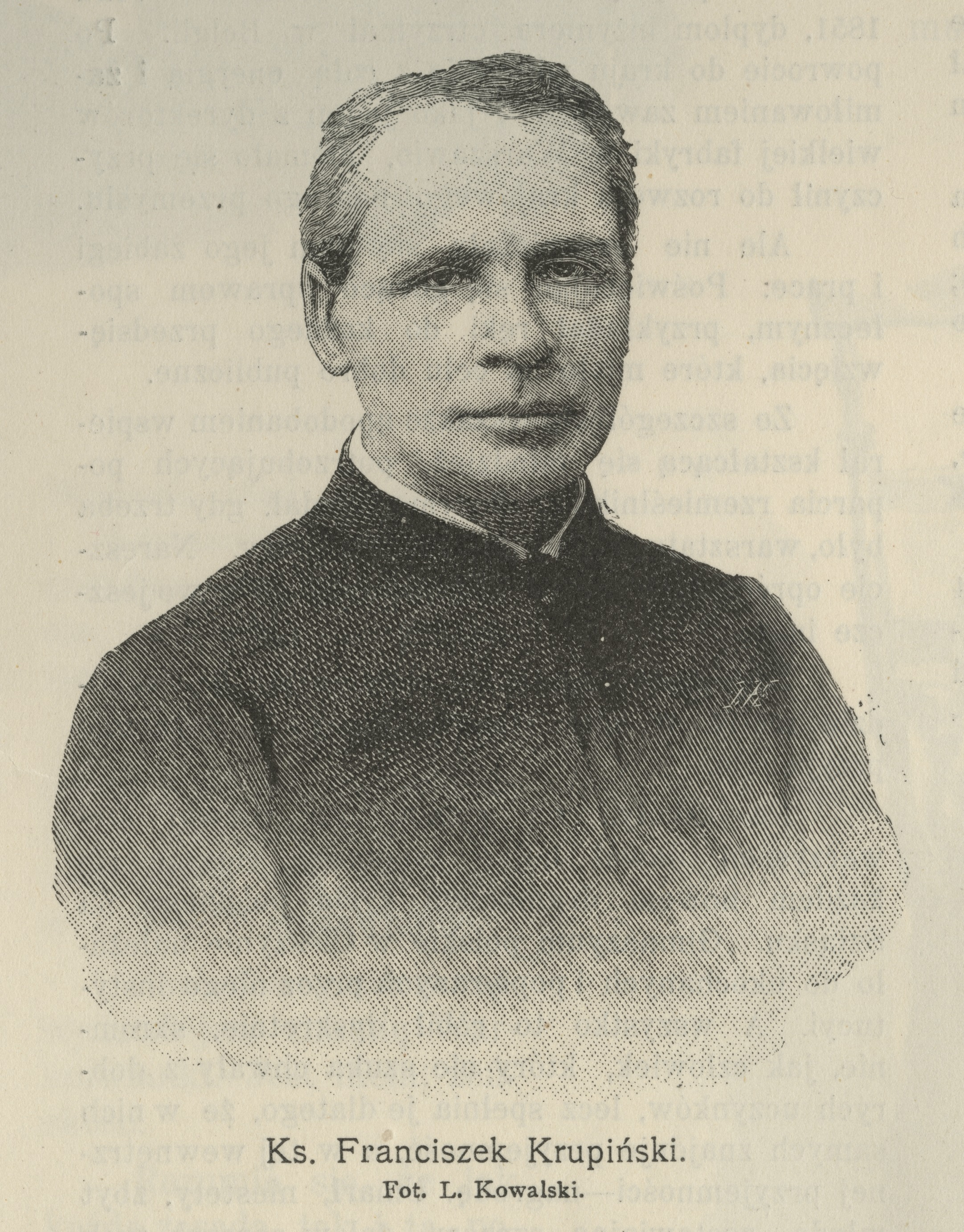

Franciszek Salezy Krupiński (January 22, 1836, Łukowie near Siedlce – August 16, 1898, Warsaw) was a Polish philosopher.

== Life ==
Krupiński was an early representative of Polish Positivism. He preached "organic work" and (though himself a Catholic priest) fought against Catholic and Romantic philosophy.

== Works ==
- Filozofia w Polsce (Philosophy in Poland; 1863)
- Szkoła pozytywna (The Positive School; 1868)
- Romantyzm i jego skutki (Romanticism and Its Consequences; 1876)
- Nasza historiozofia (Our Philosophy of History; 1876).

== See also ==
- History of philosophy in Poland
- List of Poles
