= Amelia Hertzówna =

Polish writer, cultural historian, sinologist (1879–1942)

Amelia Hertzówna (born 15 October 1879 in Warsaw, died 1942 in Warsaw) (sometimes spelled Amelia Hertz) was a Polish writer and cultural historian who earned a doctorate in chemistry in Berlin and taught in Warsaw. She was arrested during the Nazi occupation of Poland and murdered in Pawiak prison in 1942.

== Biography ==
Hertzówna was born Jewish and some time later became a baptized Christian. She remained unmarried. She was the daughter of Paulina, née Lande, and an internist named Maksymilian who helped the physician Janusz Korczak establish a Warsaw orphanage for Jewish children. Amelia graduated from the clandestine Flying University (a former underground educational enterprise) in Warsaw. Because educational opportunities for girls in Poland were scarce in the late 1890s, she went abroad to Germany and remained there for six years.

In Berlin, she passed her secondary school leaving exam as an external student and on 6 August 1904 she obtained a doctorate in chemistry there. In 1905, she began publishing dramas and short stories and established herself as an author. According to Joachim Śliwa, "the works of Amelia Hertz were highly regarded by Wilhelm Feldman and Kazimierz Czachowski, as well as literary scholars of the time." Grażyna Borkowska has written that Hertzówna, "was (is) probably the best educated Polish writer, born in Warsaw in the late 1870s."

Between the years 1908–1912, she studied ancient Near East languages and archaeology at German universities in Heidelberg, Munich, Leipzig and Berlin. In 1913 she graduated from the École du Louvre in Paris. After 1914, she published scientific articles in French and German journals.

Between the world wars, she taught in Warsaw secondary schools and in 1926, she became a member of the Polish Oriental Society. In 1930, she joined the faculty of the Free Polish University and lectured about the history of writing and the history of ancient civilization in the Near East. In 1941, during the German occupation of Poland, she was arrested by the Gestapo and imprisoned in Warsaw's Pawiak prison where she was murdered in 1942 at age 64.

== Selected works ==
In addition to journal articles, Hertzówna was the author of dramas, short stories, and works about Egypt and the history of ancient cultures.

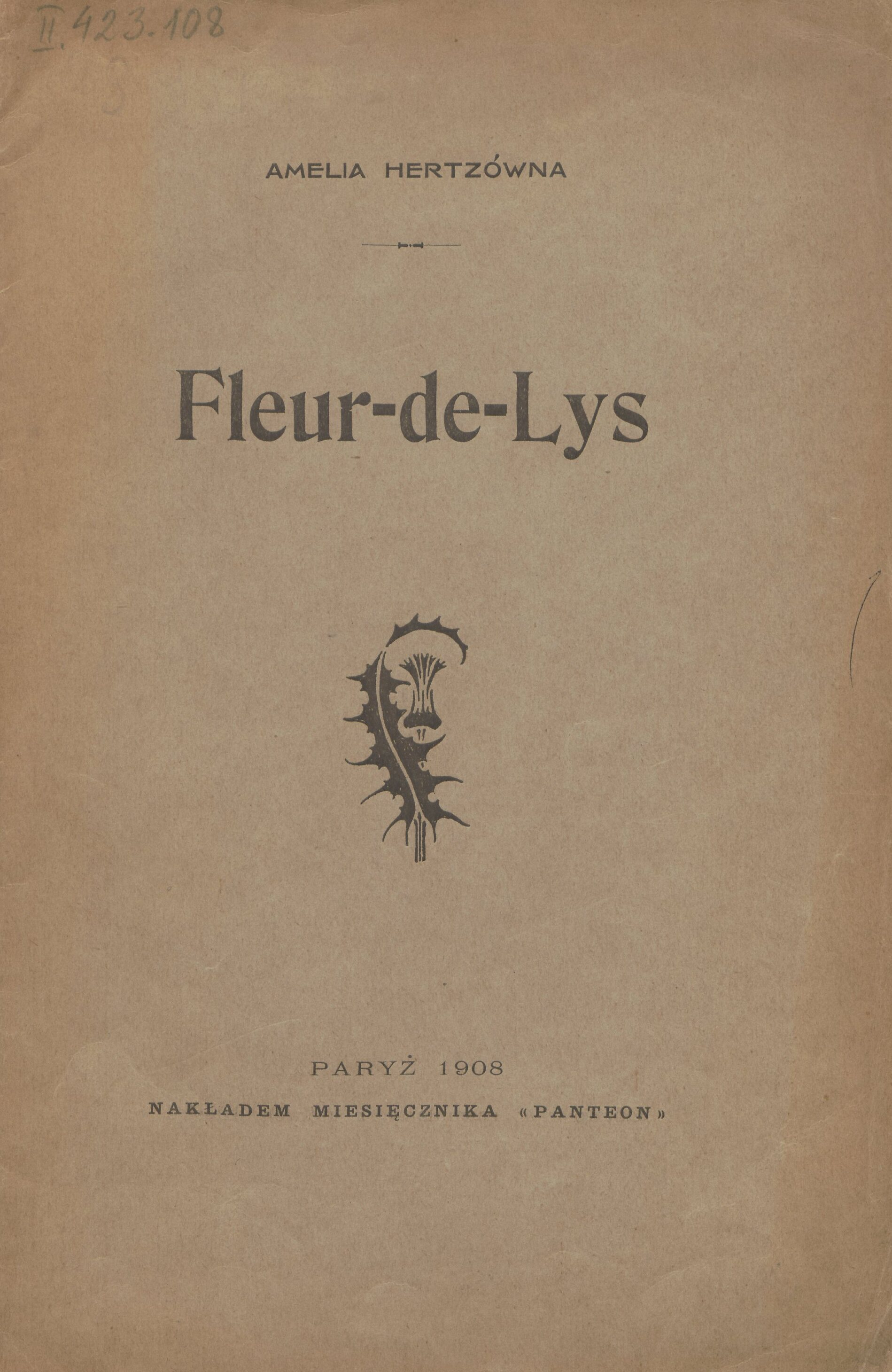
Fleur-de-Lys, 1908

=== Dramas ===
- Yseult of the White Hands (1905) published in "Chimera"
- The Fall of Tyre (1906)
- Fleur-de-Lys (1908)
- Pastorale (1909)
- Sister (1912)
- The Great King (1919)
- Collected Dramas, edited by M. Lewko, KUL Publishing House, 2003

=== Stories ===
- Meeting ("Sphinx" 1917, no. 100-101)
- Polyxena ("The World" 1918, no. 23-26)
- Ashurbanapil ("The World" 1918, no. 42-44)
- In Krakow ("Świat"1918, no. 51-52)
- The Prophet ("New Life" 1924, no. 2-3)
- Books and Janowa ("Around the World" 1927, No. 33)
- Maria and Anna ("Around the World" 1928, No. 49)
- At the Court of the Sun King ("Around the World" 1929, no. 61; reprinted with modern spelling: "Pole" 2024, no. 4(7))
- The Great Emperor Chen-Lung and Little Chau-Sien ("Around the World" 1931, No. 88)

== External sources ==
- Artur Hutnikiewicz: Młoda Polska. Wyd. IX – 5 dodruk. Warszawa: Wydawnictwo Naukowe PWN, 2012, s. 429, seria: Wielka Historia Literatury Polskiej. ISBN 978-83-01-13850-9.
