= Adam Asnyk =

Polish poet and dramatist (1838–1897)

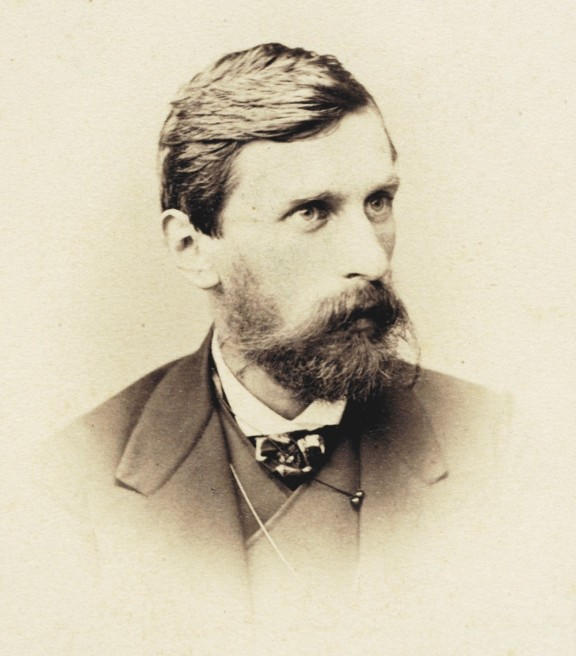
- Asnyk, c. 1863
- Born: 11 September 1838; Kalisz, Congress Poland
- Died: 2 August 1897 (aged 58); Kraków, Austria-Hungary
- Resting place: Skałka Church in Kraków
- Occupation: Poet
- Writing career
- Language: Polish
- Literary movement: Positivism

Adam Asnyk (11 September 1838 – 2 August 1897), was a Polish poet and dramatist of the Positivist era.

== Life and work ==
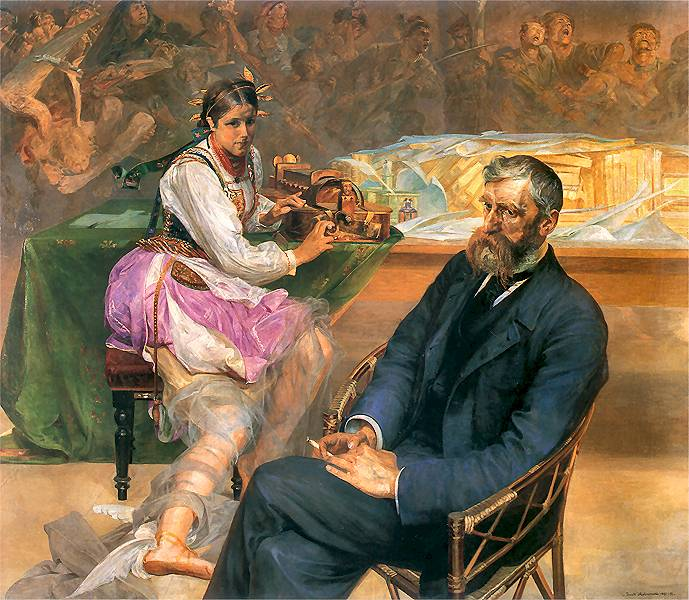
Adam Asnyk and the Muse, painting by Jacek Malczewski

Born in Kalisz to a szlachta family, he was educated to become an heir of his family's estate. As such he received education at the Institute of Agriculture and Forestry in Marymont and then the Medical Surgeon School in Warsaw. He continued his studies abroad in Breslau, Paris, Heidelberg and surprisingly in Sofia for a brief time. In 1862, he returned to Congress Poland and took part in the January Uprising against Russian rule. Because of that he had to flee his country and settled in Heidelberg, where in 1866 he received a doctorate of philosophy. Soon afterwards he returned to Poland and settled in the Austrian-held part of the country, initially in Lwów and then in Kraków.

In 1875, Asnyk married Zofia née Kaczorowska, with whom he had a son, Włodzimierz, and around that time started his career as a journalist. An editor of a Kraków-based Reforma daily, in 1884 he was also chosen to the city council of Kraków. Five years later he was elected to the Diet of Galicia and Lodomeria.

Around that time he became one of the most prominent men of culture in partitioned Poland. Among his initiatives was the creation of the Society of Popular Schools and bringing the ashes of Adam Mickiewicz to Poland. He was also among the first members of the Tatra Society. He died on 2 August 1897 in Kraków and was buried at the Skałka church, a burial place for some of the most distinguished Poles, particularly those who lived in Kraków.

== Mastery of verse ==
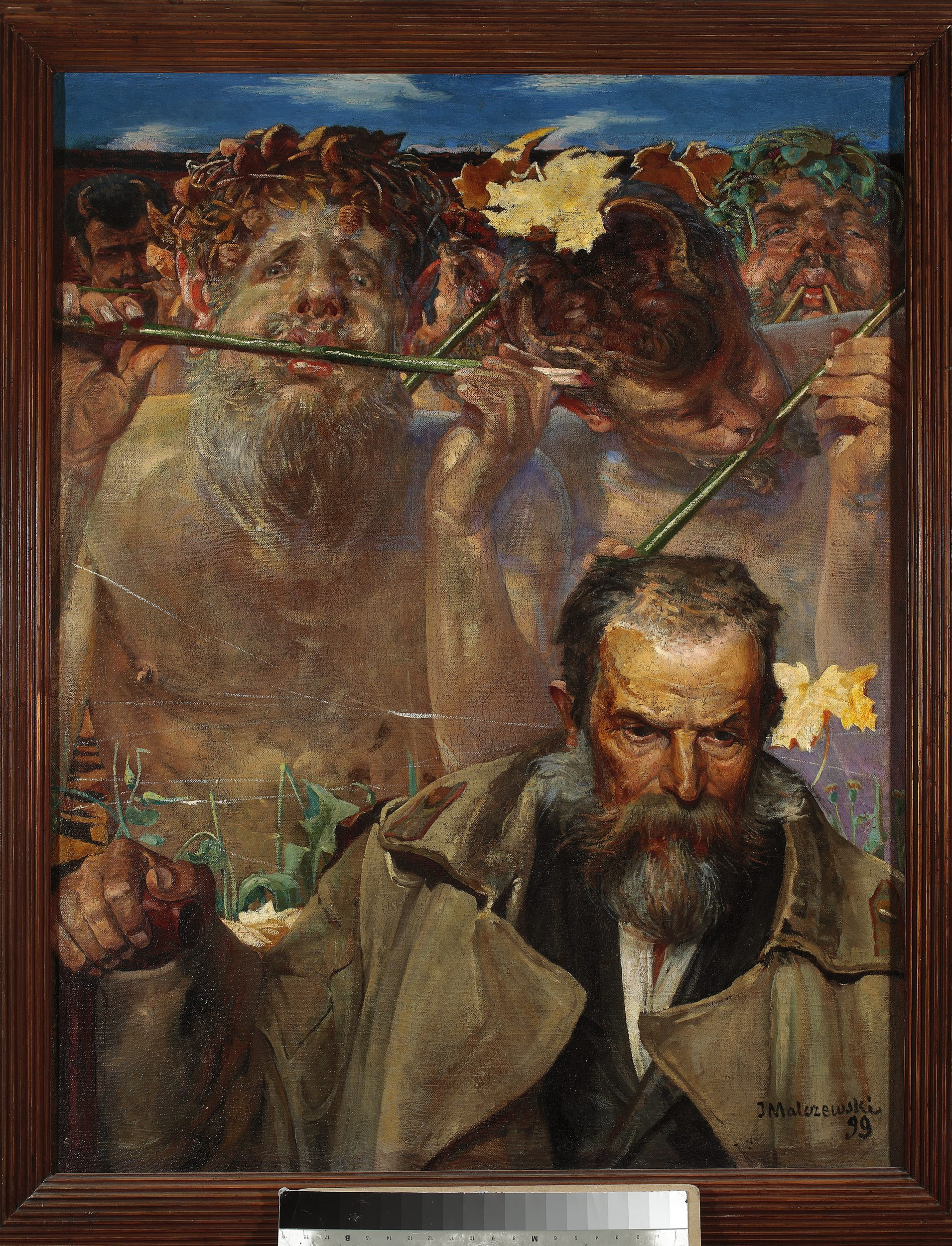
Story of a Song – Portrait of Adam Asnyk (1899) by Jacek Malczewski

Adam Asnyk was a master of verse. Some of his poems, for example Ulewa (The Heavy Rain) or Daremne żale (The Vain regrets), are among the best examples of iambic metre in all of Polish literature. He also used sophisticated strophes, for instance ottava rima. The poem Wśród przełomu (At the breakthrough) is perhaps the first use of rhyme royal in original Polish poetry. His versification was often discussed by prominent Polish scholars, among others by Maria Dłuska and Lucylla Pszczołowska.

== Books of poetry ==
- Nad głębiami (Over the Depths) (1883–1894)
- Poezje (Poetries) (1869)
- Poezje (Poetries) (1872)
- Poezje (Poetries) (1880)
- Poezje (Poetries) (1894)

== See also ==
- Positivism in Poland
