= Polish Positivism =

19th-century Polish literary and social science movement

Polish Positivism (Polish: Pozytywizm [pɔ.zɘˈtɘ.vizm]) was a social, literary and philosophical movement that became dominant in late-19th-century partitioned Poland following Romanticism in Poland and the suppression of the January 1863 Uprising against the Russian Empire. The Positivist period lasted until the turn of the 20th century and the advent of the modernist Young Poland movement.

== Overview ==
In the aftermath of the 1863 Uprising, many thoughtful Poles argued against further attempts to regain independence from the partitioning powers – the Russian Empire, the Kingdom of Prussia, and the Austro-Hungarian Empire – by force of arms. In their polemics over forms of resistance, published between 1868 and 1873 in Przegląd tygodniowy (The Weekly Review) and Prawda (Truth), they – often reluctantly and only partially – discarded the literary stylistics of the earlier Polish Romantic period.

While Polish Positivism took the name "Positivism" from the writings of French philosopher Auguste Comte, much of its ideology was actually inspired by British scholars and scientists, including Charles Darwin, Herbert Spencer, and John Stuart Mill.

The Polish Positivists advocated the exercise of reason before emotion. They believed that independence, if it was to be regained, must be won gradually, by "building from the foundations" (by creating a material infrastructure and educating the populace), and through "organic work" that would enable Polish society to function as a fully integrated "social organism" (a concept borrowed from a number of European thinkers, including Herbert Spencer).

== Objectives ==
A leading Polish philosopher of the period, the journalist, short-story writer, and novelist Bolesław Prus (author of the novels The Outpost, The Doll, The New Woman, and Pharaoh, and of the prescient 1873 study, On Discoveries and Inventions), advised his compatriots that Poland's place in the world would be determined by the Polish people's contributions to the world's scientific, technological, economic, and cultural advances.

Societal concerns addressed by the Polish Positivists included the securing of equal rights for all members of society, including peasants and women; the assimilation of Poland's Jewish minority; the elimination of illiteracy resulting from closure of Polish schools by the partitioning powers; and defense of the Polish population in German-ruled Poland against Germany's Kulturkampf and displacing of Poles with German settlers.

The Polish Positivists viewed work, rather than uprisings, as the true path to preserving Polish national identity and affirming a constructive patriotism. Aleksander Świętochowski, editor of Prawda, held that "All the great problems [abiding] in the [bosom] of mankind can be solved by education alone, and this education must be compulsory."

== Leading authors ==
Writers and novelists

- Adam Asnyk (1838–1897)
- Joseph Conrad (1857–1924)
- Adolf Dygasiński (1839–1902)
- Eliza Orzeszkowa (1841–1910)
- Maria Konopnicka (1842–1910)
- Henryk Sienkiewicz (1846–1916; Nobel Prize, 1905)
- Bolesław Prus (1847–1912)
- Wiktor Gomulicki (1848–1919)
- Aleksander Świętochowski (1849–1938)
- Antoni Sygietyński (1850–1923)
- Teodor Jeske-Choiński (1854–1920)
- Gabriela Zapolska (1857–1921)
- Maria Rodziewiczówna (1863–1944)

Poets:

- Adam Asnyk (1838–1897)
- Felicjan Faleński (1825–1910)
- Maria Ilnicka (1825 or 1827–1897)
- Aleksander Michaux (1839–1895)
- Wacław Rolicz-Lieder

Dramatists:

- Adam Asnyk (1838–1897)
- Michał Bałucki (1837–1901)
- Józef Bliziński (1827–1893)
- Felicjan Faleński (1825–1910)
- Edward Lubowski (1837–1923)
- Józef Narzymski (1839–1872)
- Zygmunt Sarnecki (1837–1922)
- Józef Szujski (1835–1883)
- Aleksander Świętochowski (1849–1938)
- Kazimierz Zalewski (1849–1919)
- Gabriela Zapolska (1857–1921)

Philosophers and critics

- Franciszek Krupiński (1836–98)
- Adolf Dygasiński (1839–1902)
- Piotr Chmielowski (1848–1904)
- Władysław Mieczysław Kozłowski (1858–1935)
- Marian Massonius (1862–1945)
- Julian Ochorowicz (1850–1917)
- Bolesław Prus (1847–1912)
- Aleksander Świętochowski (1849–1938)

== See also ==
- Polish literature
- History of philosophy in Poland: Positivism
