= Marian Massonius =

Polish philosopher

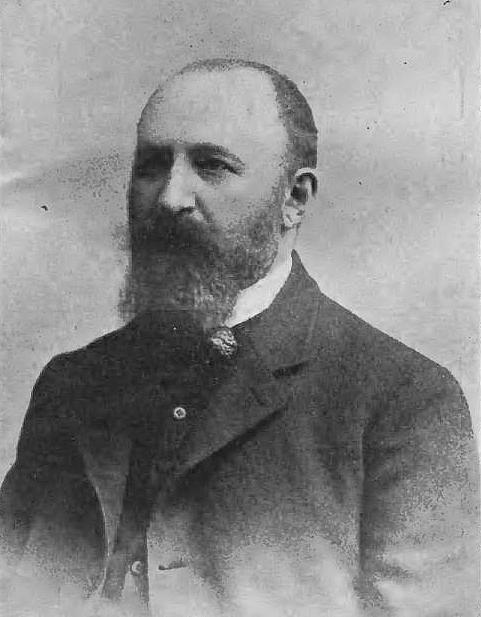
- Photograph from befroe 1906
- Born: 1 February 1862; Kursk, Russian Empire
- Died: 20 July 1945 (aged 83); Vilnius (Wilno), Second Polish Republic
- Occupations: Philosopher and teacher
- Known for: Positivism, anti-bolshevism
- Notable work: On Bolshevism

Piotr Marian Massonius (1 February 1862 – 20 July 1945) was a Polish philosopher, teacher and scholar of Positivism.

== Life ==
Massonius studied law at the Warsaw University and then abroad, where he took up philosophical and pedagogical studies at various German universities, mainly in Leipzig. He became one of the representatives of the Warsaw school of Positivism who formed a common front against Messianism together with the Polish Neo-Kantians.

Before Poland's return to independence, Massonius wrote for the Polish-language St. Petersburg weekly Kraj and contributed to the Polish-language periodicals Głos, Tygodnik Ilustrowany, Wisła, Gazeta Warszawska and Gazeta Polska. In 1897–1914 he served on the editorial board of Przegląd Filozoficzny (The Philosophical Review). In 1906 Massonius was elected to Russia's first National Duma. In 1906–14 he lectured at Warsaw's Flying University, and in 1920–32, as a professor he conducted courses in philosophy and pedagogy at Stefan Batory University in Vilnius, then part of the Second Polish Republic; in these, he focused on epistemology and aesthetics. He became dean of the Humanities Department there. His writings included a collection of philosophical essays, and Polish translations of Western philosophers such as Immanuel Kant, Émile Tardieu and Schopenhauer.

On 21 September 1920, in Poznań, Massonius published an essay On Bolshevism, including observations on the 1847 Communist Manifesto of Marx and Engels. As one of the first Polish scholars following the 1917 Russian Revolution, he warned that communist ideology was merely a tool that enabled the Bolsheviks to assume the political role of a new ruling class in Russian society. Workers and peasants – Massonius wrote – were to become an embellishment for the commissars corresponding roughly to the former Tsarist governors, heads of administrative districts (volosts), prosecutors, heads of treasury offices, directors of school departments, and so on.

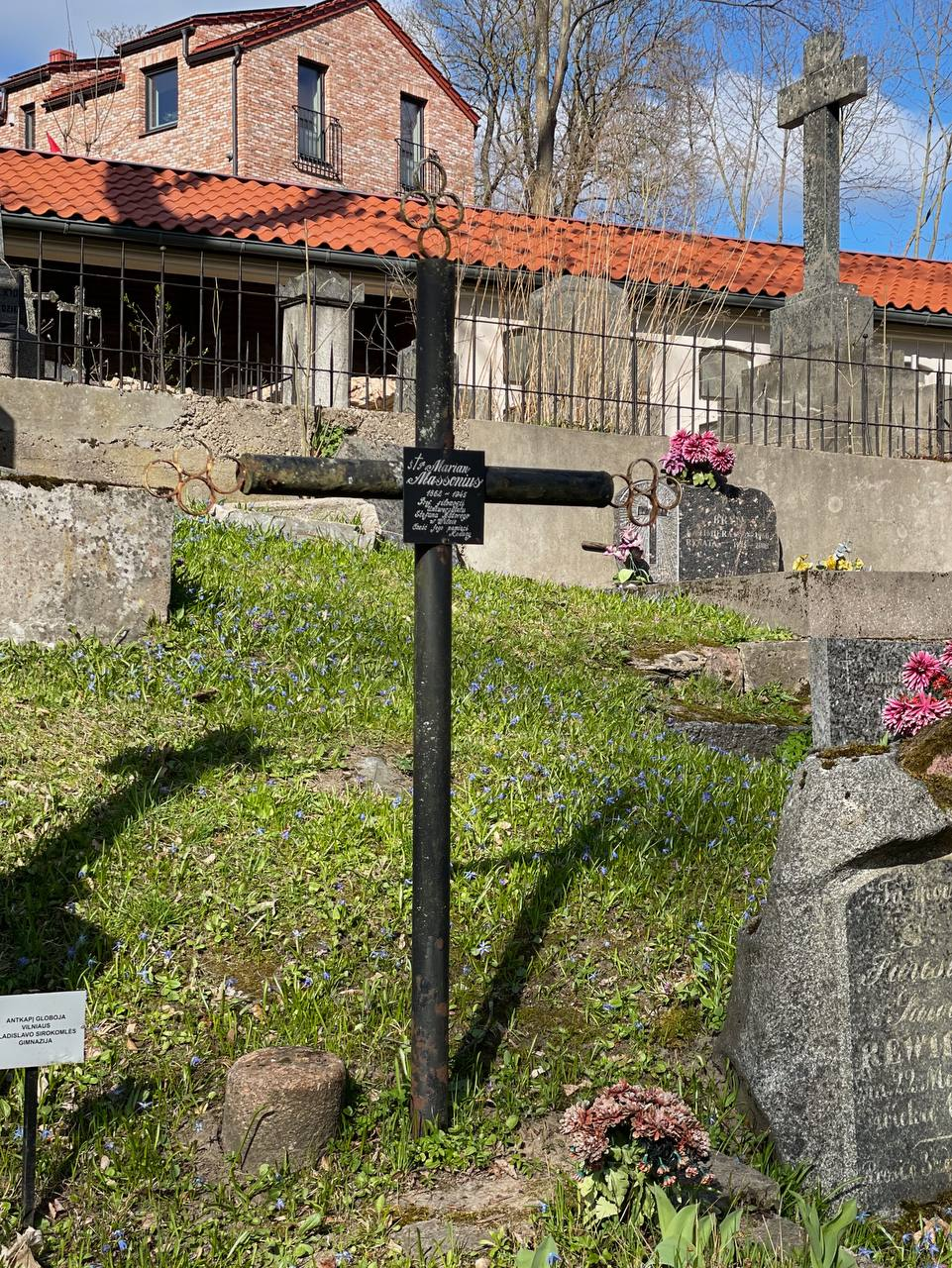
The grave of Piotr Marian Massonius at the Bernardine Cemetery in Vilnius

He wrote that the new ruling elite, comprising members of the Cheka (Extraordinary Commission for Combating Counterrevolution and Sabotage) and Red Army officers, regarded as the "right-thinking", had only one thing in common as in every oligarchy. That is, they all represented communist clubs formed in every Soviet town. These clubs constituted the actual, though unofficial government, or rather the body overseeing the activities of the official government. From the very beginning the aim of the revolutionaries was not to bring about Marxist equality among the classes, but to create a new privileged class of their own. Civil equality was never their goal, it was only an object of subversive political manipulation justifying the means, he explained.

== Works ==
- Marian Massonius, Szkice estetyczne (Sketches in Aesthetics), 1884
- Marian Massonius, Über den kritischen Realismus, 1887
- Marian Massonius, Racjonalizm w teorii poznania Kanta (Rationalism in Kant's Theory of Knowledge), 1898
- Marian Massonius, Rozdwojenie myśli polskiej (Duality of Polish Thought), 1901
- Marian Massonius, translations of, and prefaces to, works by E. Tardieu, A. Schopenhauer and E. Dubois-Reimond.
- Dr. Marian Massonius, Dzieje Uniwersytetu Wilenskiego 1781–1832 (History of Wilno University). Notatki z wykładow w roku akademickim 1924–1925 (Notes of lectures in academic year 1924–25), Toruń, Wydawnictwo Uniwersytetu Mikołaja Kopernika, 2005.
- Prof. Marian Massonius, "O bolszewizmie" (On Bolshevism). Lecture presented at Poznań, August 21, 1920, in the "Głosy na czasie" (Voices of Our Time) series, no. 45, Poznań, Księgarnia św. Wojciecha, 1921, pp. 8–19, 40-42, 56-64.

== See also ==
- History of philosophy in Poland
- List of Poles
