= Felicjan Medard Faleński =

Polish poet, playwright, prosaist and translator

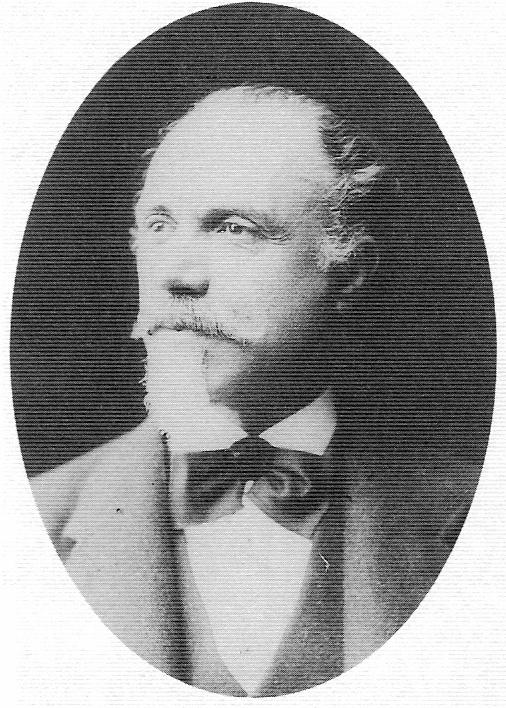
- Born: 5 June 1825
- Died: 11 October 1910
- Occupations: Poet, Novelist
- Writing career
- Language: Polish
- Genres: Romanticism, Parnassism

Felicjan Medard Faleński (5 June 1825 – 11 October 1910) was a Polish poet, playwright, prosaist and translator.

== Personal life ==
Faleński was born in Warsaw to Józef Faleński, a Supreme Court Judge, who closely collaborated with Nikołaj Nowosilcow, and Apolonia (née Jeszko). He attended a provincial gymnasium in Warsaw, studied law and became a member of a secret circle of lawyers. At university he met Cyprian Kamil Norwid and Józef Ignacy Kraszewski. He also participated in clandestine groupings. Forced to escape from arrest, Faleński left the country and emigrated to East Prussia. After his return he worked in the library of the Zamoyski and during the Spring of Nations came back to conspirational activity. He was published in the periodical "Warsaw Library" in 1850. Next he lived in Radom and accepted a job as a teacher in Sandomierz. In 1855 he returned to Warsaw and took up writing. During the January Uprising Faleński supported the radical faction, called the Reds. In 1858 he married Maria Trębicka, to whom Norwid had proposed unsuccessfully.

== Creation ==
As a wrighter Faleński remained independent of contemporary literary trends. He practiced intellectual-reflective lyricism, moving psychological and moral issues in tone of skeptical irony. His poetry characterized by a wealth of strophic and versification forms as also an unusual imagery. He was the first Polish researcher of Edgar Allan Poe's works. He made an original analysis of Kochanowski's epigrams and lamentations, analyzed the works of Mikołaj Sęp Szarzyński, prepared Teodor Krzywicki's edition of poetry and announced a lot of translations. Regarded as a conjurer of poetic form and one of the first explorers of „literary Tatras”, he was the first Polish author of so-called meanders. His poems under the mantle of biting irony and the sophisticated, classical form of hidden deep sorrow caused by vanishing happiness, death and lie rooted in human nature. The poet was inspired by the literary achievements of Leconte de Lisle, often referring to the color of Orient, Greek mythology, the tradition of ancient Egypt or Slavic culture. He also reached humorous motifs. Some of his works are parodic interpretations of myths and legends. Faleński treated poetic translations not only as an approximation of foreign literature, but also as a full-fledged component of his work. He has translated the literature of different times, including artists such as Hesiod, Horace, Petrarch, Victor Hugo or Alfred de Musset. Frequently he explained only the most important and interesting excerpts from larger works, trying to give back the original values using the Polish historical and individual styles, while many of his contemporary translators adapted translations to their own stylistic convention.

== Works ==
=== Collections of poetry ===
- Kwiaty i kolce – The flowers and the spikes (1856)
- Selected poems (1861)
- Z po nad mogił – From over the graves (1870)
- Odgłosy z gór – The sounds of the mountains (1871)
- Przebrzmiałe dźwięki – The outworn sounds (1874)
- Świstki Sylena – The scraps of Sylen (1876)
- Meandry – The Meanders (1892)
- Pieśni spóźnione – The late songs (1893)

=== Collections of prose and drama ===
- Postacie z latarni czarnoksięskiej – The characters from the wizard lantern (1875)
- Novels (1884)
- Dramas (1899, 3 volumes)
- Tańce śmierci – Dances of death (1964)

=== Theoretical-literary works ===
- Edgar Allan Poe and his novels (1861)
- About Jan Kochanowski as a lyric (1867)
- Lamentations of Jan Kochanowski (1867)

=== Translations ===
- Chopin, Liszt (1873)
- The Merry Wives of Windsor, Shakespeare (1875)
- The songs of Petrarch (1881)
- The vain desires, Juvenal (1892)
- The mad Orland, Ariosto (1902)

== See also ==
- Józef Ignacy Kraszewski
- List of Poles
- Cyprian Norwid
