= Piotr Chmielowski =

Polish historian and philosopher (1848–1904)

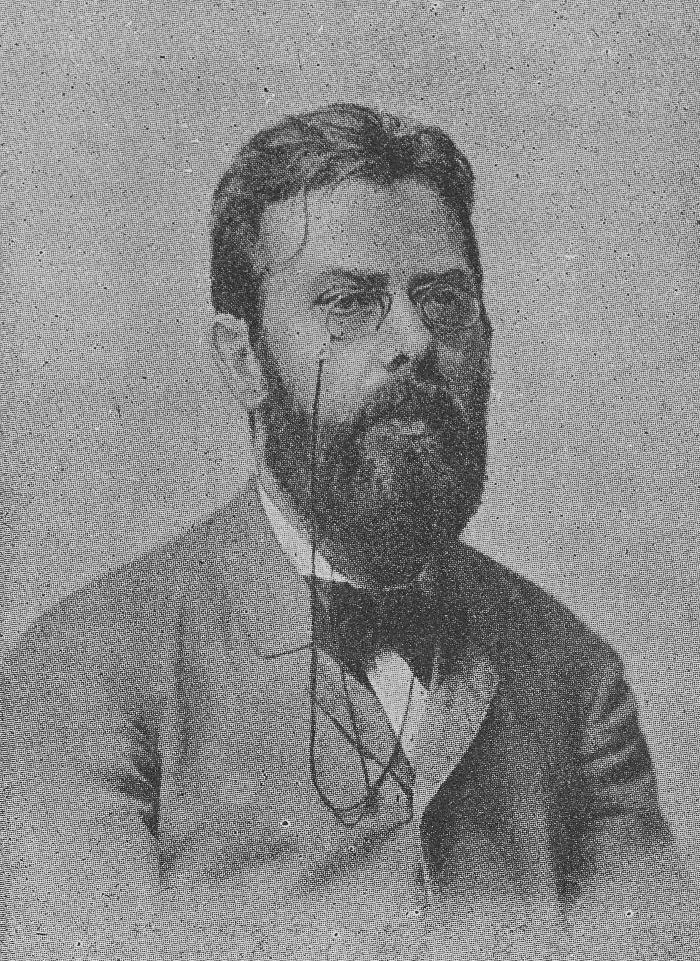
- Born: 9 February 1848; Zawadyńce
- Died: 22 April 1904 (aged 56); Lemberg

Academic background
- Education: University of Warsaw; Leipzig University
- Influences: Mickiewicz · Żmichowska · Taine · Wyspiański

Academic work
- Era: Positivism
- School or tradition: Literary realism Utilitarianism

Signature
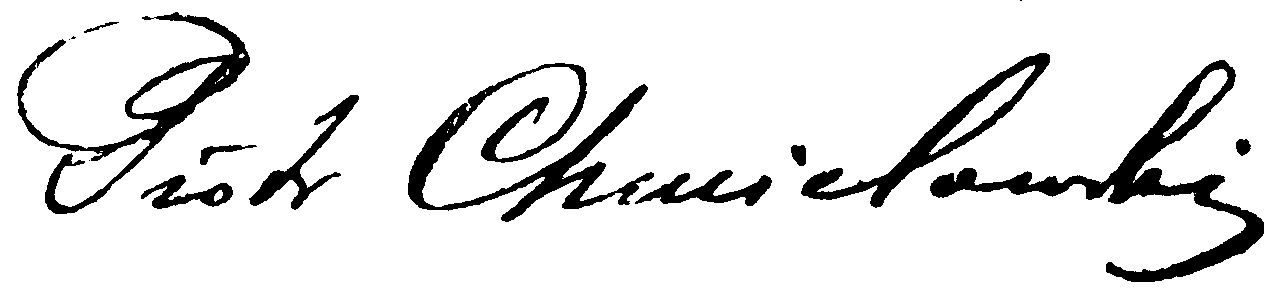

Piotr Chmielowski (9 February 1848 – 22 April 1904) was a Polish philosopher, literary historian and critic.

== Life ==
After studying at Warsaw's Main School in Russian Poland and at Leipzig University (to 1874), Chmielowski taught till 1898 in Warsaw private schools. From 1903 he was a professor at Lwów University in Austrian Poland.

He wrote for many periodicals. In 1881–97 he edited the Ateneum. From 1893 he was a member of the Kraków-based Academy of Learning.

Chmielowski was the outstanding student and critic of literature during Poland's Positivist period. He advocated social utilitarianism in literature, and the realistic treatment of social reality. As a historian he was influenced by the philosophical and esthetic concepts of the French critic Hippolyte Taine, and studied the relations between writers' works and their social and cultural milieux, seeking the expressions of those relations chiefly in the works' ideological concerns.

Chmielowski died on 22 April 1904 in Lwów and was interred at the Łyczakowski Cemetery.

== Works ==
- Zarys literatury polskiej z ostatnich lat szesnastu (An Outline of Polish Literature of the Last Sixteen Years, 1881, 4th ed. 1898)
- Liberalizm i obskurantyzm na Litwie i Rusi (Liberalism and Obscurantism in Lithuania and Rus, 1883)
- Złota przędza (The Golden Thread, vols. 1–4, 1884–87)
- Nasi powieściopisarze (Our Novelists, 1887–95)
- Nasza literatura dramatyczna (Our Dramatic Literature, 2 vols., 1898)
- Historia literatury polskiej (A History of Polish Literature, vols. 1–6, 1899–1900)
- Najnowsze prądy w poezji naszej (The Newest Currents in Our Poetry, 1901)
- Dramat polski... (Polish Drama..., 1902)
- Dzieje krytyki literackiej w Polsce (The History of Literary Criticism in Poland, 1902)
- Pisma krytyczno-literackie (Critical-Literary Writings, 2 vols., 1961)
- Prace z metodyki literatury i stylistyki (Works in the Methodology of Literature and Stylistics, 1961).

== See also ==
- History of philosophy in Poland
- List of Poles
