= Feliks Rajmund Podkóliński =

Polish physician and soldier (1878–1966)

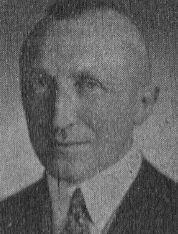
Feliks Rajmund Podkóliński

Feliks Rajmund Podkóliński (30 August 1878 – 1966) was a Polish physician and soldier, active in World War I. He was also chief physician of the Evangelical Hospital in Warsaw.
