= Józef Trzemeski =

Józef Trzemeski (1878-1923) was a Polish physicist, general, and member of the Russian expedition to the Kara Sea in 1914-1915.
